The History of Oregon State Beavers football covers more than 120 seasons since the team began play in 1893.

Early years

Origins of the program
In 1893, Oregon State College was known as State Agricultural College (SAC). William H. Bloss, son of SAC's school president, was the school's first coach, and the quarterback of the 1893 team. Bloss moved to Corvallis, Oregon in June 1892. He previously played football in the Midwest, and was considered very knowledgeable of  football.

Bloss scheduled tryouts in the fall of 1893 trying to assemble a football team. By mid-October, he had found 17 players that would make up the first football team in Oregon State's history. The team was a hodgepodge of young men in Corvallis. Four players were not students, including Coach Bloss. One was a high school junior and another was a faculty member.

SAC played its first games on an open grass lot with a perimeter fence. In 1896 or 1897, bleachers were built for the south side, which was designated the home side, and in 1899–1901, bleachers were built for the visitors on the north side. It was known as College Field on Lower Campus.

The first game was played on November 11, 1893, at College Field on Lower Campus against Albany College. Over 500 spectators, who paid a ten cents admission, cheered on SAC to 62–0 win. Brady F. Burnett scored the first touchdown in Oregon State history on a fumble return.

Norcross years

In 1906, Oregon Agricultural hired Fred Norcross as its head football coach. Norcross had played quarterback for Fielding H. Yost's "Point a Minute" Michigan Wolverines from 1903 to 1905. The Wolverines went 33–1–1 during that time.

Through the first six games of the 1906 season, Oregon Agricultural had compiled a 4–0–2 record, outscoring opponents, 77–0. In the final game of the season, Willamette defeated Oregon Agricultural, kicking a 23-yard field goal midway through the first half, the only points either team scored. Despite the result, Oregon Agricultural students marched through the streets of Salem, Oregon, chanting Oregon Agricultural fight songs.

Oregon Agricultural started the 1907 season winning their first four games and then defeated Willamette, 42–0. On Thanksgiving Day, the undefeated Aggies faced undefeated St. Vincent's College. The game marked the first time Oregon Agricultural had traveled south of Berkeley. Oregon Agricultural prevailed with a 10–0 victory.  The 1907 team was undefeated, untied, and unscored upon.  When the team returned to Corvallis, 3,000 fans turned out to greet them, approximately the combined population of the town and the school.  The band led the team and the crowd from downtown to the college in celebration.

In 1908, Oregon Agricultural began 4–0–1, outscoring their opponents, 73–0, including a 28–0 rout of Willamette.  In the first 18 games under coach Norcross, Oregon Agricultural outscored their opponents 287–4, while compiling a 14–1–3 record.  It did not last.  Oregon Agricultural lost their final three games in 1908, including losses to Oregon and Washington.  After the season, Oregon Agricultural and Norcross went their separate ways.  Norcross never coached again, leaving his career college football coaching record at 14–4–3, a .738 winning percentage.

1909–1915
In 1910, Oregon Agricultural's loss to Oregon triggered a riot.  The fist-fighting was so bad that the 1911 game between the two schools was canceled. A cigar-maker, Billy Eagles, proposed Albany, Oregon, as a neutral site to host the 1912 game, a 3–0 Oregon victory. It also served as a host for the 1913 Civil War.  It would only be used one more time by the Beavers, to host the Sun Dodgers from the University of Washington in 1914.

The 1912 Civil War loss to Oregon cemented a losing season for the Beavers, snapping a streak of eight consecutive winning seasons.  The 1904–1911 winning season streak remains the longest winning season streak in Oregon State history.

In 1914, Oregon State compiled a 7–0–2 record and played Washington to a scoreless tie, ending Washington's record-setting winning streak that dated back to 1908.

The 1915 season started off brightly.  After three games, the Beavers were 3–0.  Their fourth game was a 29–0 loss was to undefeated and untied Washington State.  The loss snapped Oregon State's 15-game unbeaten streak, which continues to be the longest streak in Beaver history.  Washington State would later go on to finish 7–0 and win the 1916 Rose Bowl against Brown, laying a claim to the national championship.  What looked like an even more daunting challenge awaited.

Game five was most of the way across the country in East Lansing, Michigan.  The Beavers' opponent was the Michigan Aggies, who had pummeled the Michigan Wolverines 24–0 in Ann Arbor the week before.  Coupled with a train ride spanning two-thirds of the country without the ability to practice, the odds of a Beaver victory seemed slim at best.  Roscoe Fawcett of Portland's Morning Oregonian set the odds at around zero, when he wrote, "One thing is very certain, and that is the Corvallis boys are due for a trimming...and a bad one!"

The 20–0 Beaver victory sent shock waves across the country. Sportswriter Grantland Rice was moved to write a poem called "The Pacific Slump."  A portion went:

"Ah yes, it's sad to think about the Old Pacific Slump,
The way the West has hit the chute and hit it with a bump;
But when you speak of things like this in a manner somewhat free,
don't mention it at Michigan or up at MAC;
They haven't any stuff at all to call for autumn boasts,
except a team that smeared a team that smashed a team of Yost's."
The Beavers returned home and thrashed Idaho 40–0 to run their record to 5–1 but dropped their last two games to finish the 1915 season 5–3.

1916–1923
The Beavers' 1916 Thanksgiving Day win in Southern California against the USC Trojans would be their last victory over the Men of Troy until 1935.  Herman Abraham garnered All-American honors in 1916 thanks in part to his play in the game in East Lansing in 1915.  The Great War and its call for troops swiftly reduced the Beavers to mediocrity.  Only the 1917 and 1921 teams posted winning records.  Coaches Joseph Pipall and H. G. Hargiss each only lasted two years.  College Field was renamed Bell Field in 1921.

Coach R. B. Rutherford defeated Washington for the first time in 15 years in 1920 and posted a winning record in 1921.  However, a losing record in 1922 put his position in jeopardy.  Throwing caution to the wind, he took the 4–3–2 Beavers to Hawaii in 1923 for Oregon Agricultural's first games outside of the contiguous United States.  The gamble did not pay off as the Beavers dropped a game to the Hawaiian All-Stars, playing their first college team, 14–9, and then another to the University of Hawaii, 7–0.  The loss to Hawaii was a huge upset, as Hawaii had only begun playing intercollegiate football in 1920.  A rainbow appeared over the field after the game, which led to Hawaii's team being nicknamed the Rainbows.  The losses were devastating for a small agricultural school in Oregon, which had to pay to travel to Hawaii and suffered two humiliating defeats and, consequently, a second consecutive losing season, tying their longest losing-season streak to date.  Coach R. B. Rutherford resigned as head coach shortly thereafter.
Something to add.I was told by Bill Martin, who played for the 1923 State Champion The Dalles High School Indians, that the Indians defeated the Beavers that year in The Dalles.

Schissler years
In 1924, the Beavers found themselves without a coach again. They received 55 applications for the vacant position, and each was rejected.  Instead, the Beavers found Paul Schissler. Schissler had been the coach at tiny Lombard College in Illinois for three years.  During that time, he had lost a single game, 14–0 to Notre Dame.  The Beavers received three letters of recommendation: one from Major L. Griffith, commissioner of the Big Ten; one from Walter Eckersall, sports editor for the Chicago Tribune; and one from Knute Rockne, coach of Notre Dame.  He was hired.  The Beaver fans were excited by the new hire.  In anticipation, the alumni raised $21,000 to increase seating at Bell Field from 7,000 to 18,000.

The first thing Schissler did was eliminate the alumni game.  This freed up an extra weekend to schedule non-traditional opponents.  The 1924 season started well.  The Beavers beat Whitman 41–0 and Multnomah A.C. 7–6.  However, it quickly soured, as they proceeded to lose five of their last six games to finish with a losing record for a third consecutive season.

Over the next two seasons, the Beavers went 14–3.  Their only losses in 1925 were in California, at Stanford, defending Pacific Coast champions, and at USC in the Beavers first game in the Coliseum.

In 1926, the Beavers started fast, outscoring their opponents 166–13. In the fourth game, Oregon Agricultural defeated California in Berkeley, 27–7.  The game was the Beavers' first victory over California. In the following game, a pesky Idaho team held the Beavers scoreless until an interception return by quarterback Howard Maple set up a field goal, which proved to be the only points scored by either team.  On Veteran's Day, the Trojans beat Oregon Agricultural 17–7 in Portland.  Those would prove to be the last points scored against the Beavers.  The Beavers beat Oregon 16–0 after Howard Maple scored two fourth-quarter touchdowns on a sea of mud in Corvallis.  Six days later, on Thanksgiving Day, Oregon State was in Milwaukee, Wisconsin to take on the Marquette Golden Avalanche.  Marquette had defeated the Kansas Aggies 14–0 and Auburn 19–3 in Birmingham, Alabama, in consecutive weekends leading up to the game against the Beavers.  The losses were the largest Kansas and Auburn experienced in 1926.  The Golden Avalanche were double-digit favorites in a game the Chicago Tribune hailed as the most important game in the Midwest.  Marquette supplied the home field, but the Beavers supplied the weather bringing a heavy fog with them.  The Beavers jumped out to a 16–0 halftime lead before leaving Milwaukee with a 29–0 victory.  The 1926 Beavers outscored their opponents 221–30.  Their defense finished first in the nation in scoring and tenth overall.  The 7–1 record would serve as the Beavers best between the 1914 and 2000 seasons.

In 1927, Oregon Agricultural College became Oregon State Agricultural College, and the Oregon State Beavers were born.  Oregon State started 1–2 under the new moniker.  Game four was at home against Washington State, a 13–6 victory.  This marked the last time that John Richard Newton Bell threw his top hat into the Willamette River, which he had done after every Beaver victory in Corvallis since 1894.  The Beavers then split the next two games, beating Oregon and losing to Idaho.  Their final game was against Carnegie Tech in a game the media hailed as the first East–West game of the year.  The year before, Carnegie Tech defeated Notre Dame 19–0, ruining Notre Dame's undefeated season.  The Beavers fared slightly better in their 14–14 tie.  Oregon State tied the game on an eight-yard touchdown scamper in the waning minutes.  Carnegie Tech went on to defeat the Irish in the rematch in 1928, 27–7.

In 1928, the Beavers stumbled to a 5–3 record.  Game nine was a revolution.  It marked the first time a team from the West Coast traveled across the country to play a team from the East Coast.  It matched the Beavers against the New York University Violets in Yankee Stadium on Thanksgiving Day.  It was the first college football game held in Yankee Stadium on Thanksgiving Day.  New York University was a juggernaut.  They were 7–1 with wins over Fordham, 34–7; Rutgers, 48–0; Colgate, 47–6; Missouri, 27–6; and Carnegie Tech, 27–13.  The losses by Fordham, Rutgers, and Colgate were the largest each would endure in 1928.  The 27–13 loss was Carnegie Tech's only loss of the year.  The Violets' only loss was a 7–2 affair to an eight-win Georgetown team.  New York was led by Ken Strong, a multi-year All-American, who wound up leading the nation in scoring in 1928.  Most people did not give the Beavers much of a chance.  One New York paper referred to the Beavers as "peasants from the rain belt."  At kickoff, Oregon State was 3–1 underdogs.  New York came out early striking first with an early touchdown, but the Beavers rallied with 19 second-quarter points: two touchdown runs by Cecil Sherwood and Carl Gilmore and a touchdown pass from Howard Maple to "Wild Bill" McKalip.  The game was revolutionary for the east coast, which was not used to seeing the quantities of the lateral, the forward pass, and the misdirection that the Beavers employed.  Another touchdown run by Henry "Honolulu" Hughes put the game out of reach.  New York scored late to make the score a more respectable 25–13.  The win helped earn Howard Maple All-American honors.  It was hailed by many as the upset of the year.  Comparing New York to Man o' War, Will Rogers commented on the game in his column letting go of his frustration at what the Oregon "apple-knockers" had done to his "city slickers". When the Beavers returned from New York, Governor Patterson honored them at a dinner in Portland.  In Corvallis, 4000 turned out to meet them at the station. The win remains Oregon State's easternmost victory in its history.

In 1929, the Beavers started off 4–4. Game nine was against the University of Detroit Titans in Detroit, Michigan. The Titans, the defending national champions, had not lost a game since Notre Dame tripped them up in October 1927. In the two weeks leading up to the Oregon State game, the Titans had traveled to West Virginia and Michigan State and beat them by a combined 61–0. The Beavers beat the Titans 14–7, ending Detroit's 22-game unbeaten streak.

The Beavers started 1930 going 6–3.  Two of their three losses were in California, against USC, the defending Pacific Coast champions, at the Coliseum, 27–7, and Stanford, 13–7.  The final loss was to Washington State.  Oregon State tied the score at seven in the fourth quarter, only to see the Cougars return an interception 26 yards for a 14–7 Washington State win.  The Cougars wound up champions of the Pacific Coast Conference.  The 14 Washington State points were the last Oregon State would allow.  "Wild Bill" McKalip blocked two punts which led to scores against undefeated Oregon in a 15–0 Beaver shutout.  Oregon State also beat UCLA in the Coliseum 19–0.  The Beavers only allowed the Bruins four first downs.  Oregon State capped off their 1930 season by traveling to Soldier Field to play against West Virginia.  The Beavers had to battle ice, snow, and subzero temperatures, but the Beavers would once again prove victorious, besting the Mountaineers 12–0 on two "Wild Bill" McKalip touchdowns in the second half.

In 1931, Oregon State scheduled Colorado. For the first time in four years, they would not have to leave the West Coast.  The Beavers started off with a 76–0 win over Willamette.  This remains the largest margin of victory in a Beavers game.  It also was the most points the Beavers would score in a game until they scored 77 against Nicholls State in 2012.  The season continued on a high note with a 16–0 victory over Colorado.  From there, the Beavers went 3–3.  The Civil War was intriguing.  The winner would meet Utah in Portland, Oregon, to raise money for the unemployed.  Oregon and Oregon State combined for 37 punts in a scoreless tie.  A poll of sports writers chose Oregon State as the "winner".  Utah was the most dominant team in their region.  They were in the midst of winning six consecutive Rocky Mountain Conference championships.  They also had lost only one game in the previous 32, a one-point loss to Washington in Seattle, Washington.  Over the past 32 games, they posted a 28–1–3 record.  Over their past 24, they had posted a 23–1 record.  In Portland, Oregon State beat the Utes 12–0.  The 12–0 win was the largest loss for Utah in more than four years.

In 1932, Oregon State had a very ambitious schedule, finishing with games against the Fordham Rams at the Polo grounds and the Detroit Titans in the Motor City five days later on Thanksgiving Day.  The Beavers were 4–4 when they played Fordham, but there was no magic left.  Oregon State dropped both games, losing 8–6 to the Rams and 14–6 to the Titans.

The 1932 season was Paul Schissler's last. In an effort to save money due in part to the Great Depression, Oregon State attempted to reduce Paul Schissler's salary by $800 per year. He refused the pay cut, resigning to become the coach of the Chicago Cardinals.  For the next four years, he coached in Chicago and Brooklyn, compiling a 14–29–3 record.

Stiner years

1933 "Men of Iron
In 1933, Oregon State promoted assistant coach Lon Stiner to be the new head coach. In their first four games under Stiner, the Beavers went 3–0–1, outscoring their opponents, 62–0. In game five, Oregon State's Norman "Ramblin' Red" Franklin returned the opening kickoff 94 yards for a touchdown, as Stiner's team defeated the San Francisco Dons, 12–7, using only 12 players. In week 6, Stiner coached in one of the greatest upset ties in college football history.  On October 21, 1933, eleven Beaver "Iron Men" fought USC to a scoreless tie in what many consider to be the greatest game in Oregon State football history.  The Trojans, defending two-time national champions, brought 25-game winning streak and an 80-man squad to Multnomah Stadium in Portland, Oregon, and saw their win streak broken by the Beavers.  The Beavers did not make a substitution, playing only 11 men, each of whom played both ways for the entire 60 minutes. Red Franklin also had two interceptions in the Beavers' red zone, which helped to fend off the Trojan attack. The 1933 team was immortalized in a line of Oregon State's fight song, "Men of Iron, their strength will never yield."

The following game, in the second quarter, Oregon State's Clyde Devine blocked a Washington State punt, which rolled back into the end zone for a safety.  The lone score held up as the Ironmen beat the Cougars 2–0, using only one substitute.  The Washington State game is also memorable because it saw the first use of the Pyramid Play.  The Beavers also used the play twice in a 13–3 loss to 7–0 Oregon, which knocked the Beavers out of the Rose Bowl race.  Instead, 5–1–2 Oregon State traveled back to the Polo Grounds for a rematch with Fordham.  The Rams were a much better team than the year before.  They were 6–1 with wins against West Virginia 20–0 and New York 20–12.  They also provided Alabama and Boston College with their only losses in 1933 by a combined score of 34–6.  It was generally accepted that a win over the Beavers would secure a berth in the 1934 Rose Bowl, so they naturally were very motivated.  However, Red Franklin returned the opening kickoff 94 yards for a touchdown and a 6–0 Oregon State lead.  After the Rams scored a touchdown in the second quarter, the Beavers successfully used the Pyramid Play to keep the score tied at six.  With just over a minute left in the first half, Oregon State's Adolphe Schwammel's 46-yard field goal cleared the crossbar by three feet to beat the Rams 9–6.  The Beavers had allowed only four completed passes all year, but the Rams completed 10 in the loss.  The few Beaver fans that had made the cross-country trip were enough to tear down both goalposts.  The loss knocked Fordham out of the Rose Bowl picture; Columbia went instead.  The win over Fordham remains the easternmost Oregon State victory since the 1928 victory over New York.

The Fordham game was scheduled to be the last game of the season, but 7–1 Nebraska coaxed Oregon State to Lincoln, Nebraska, on Thanksgiving Day with promises of two more games in 1935 and 1936.  The season thus ended with a 22–0 loss at the hands of Nebraska, but the two losses were the fewest for the Beavers in seven years.

The 1933 Beavers were the last to face a Paul Schissler-type schedule.  From 1934 to 1948, Oregon State only scheduled three trips out of the two time zones of the Pacific Coast Conference.

1934 to 1938
The Beavers from 1934 to 1938 amassed a 21–22–7 record. The biggest victory of the era was a 13–7 win over the Trojans in 1935 at the Los Angeles Coliseum. It would be the last such win for the Beavers until 1960. The 1936 team ended Oregon's four-game Civil War winning streak.  Perhaps, no season typified the five-year stretch like the 3–3–3 record Oregon State recorded in 1937.  The final game was perhaps the worst loss in Beaver history, 7–0 to 2–3–3 Washington State. Oregon State only managed one first down.

1939 to 1940
1939 breathed new life into the program.  Oregon State's opener was a 12–0 victory over Stanford.  Their next three games were decided by a combined 10 points, all Beaver victories.  The 4–0 record earned the Beavers an AP #15 ranking.  It was their first appearance in the relatively new poll.  At the end of October, Oregon State beat Washington State 13–0, the Beavers' most lopsided win of the young year.  It earned them a #11 ranking, which would be their highest until 1956.  The next week, the #7 Trojans en route to a national championship came to Portland and beat the Beavers 19–7.  It was the most points the Beavers would allow all year and took them out of the Rose Bowl race.

Oregon State beat Oregon and California (the Beavers first win over California outside of Berkeley) a combined 40–14.  The following weekend, Oregon State looked like it would upset Jackie Robinson and #13 UCLA in the Coliseum, but the Bruins' Leo Cantor scored a touchdown with 1:01 left, tying the game at 13.  The 13–13 score held up, but the 7–1–1 record was good enough for an invitation to play in the inaugural 1940 Pineapple Bowl against Hawaii, which the Beavers accepted.  Much like in 1923, the Bowl was actually a two-game series in Hawaii.  The first was against the Heanlani town team on Christmas Day, which Oregon State won 28–0.  On New Years Day, the Beavers hopped out to a 19–0 first-quarter lead and never looked back in a 39–6 rout.  The nine Beaver victories in the 1939 were the most ever, and the 9–1–1 record would stand as Oregon State's best record in between the 1926 and 2000 seasons.

Despite the defense allowing only 80 points in the nine game slate, the 1940 season proved disappointing.  Oregon State jumped out of the gates 2–0–1, including a tie against the Trojans in the Coliseum but lost to #16 Washington in Seattle, 19–0.  The 19 Husky points were the first of the year.  Two more wins over California and UCLA in California and a win over Washington State brought Oregon State's record to 5–1–1.  Through the first seven games they allowed only 32 points and posted five shutouts (the most in a season since 1933).  However, the Beavers' record would get no better with losses in  their fourth trip to California against the #4 Stanford Indians and the Civil War.  The Oregon win would be the Ducks sole Civil War win between 1935 and 1947.

1941: Rose Bowl

The 1941 season was a peculiar one.  For the first time ever, Oregon State was scheduled to play every Pacific Coast Conference team.  They were the only team to do so in 1941.  With the memories of the 1940 Pineapple Bowl victory fading, the Beavers were picked to finish near the bottom of the conference.  The season began in the Coliseum against the Trojans.  The Beavers jumped out to a 7–0 first half lead, but the Trojans tied the game before halftime.  The game almost ended in a tie, but the Trojans' Doug Essick hauled in a six-yard a touchdown with 13 seconds left to win 13–7.  The Beavers responded by beating Washington in Portland, 9–6.  After Washington, defending Pacific Coast champion Stanford came to Corvallis with their 13-game winning streak and #2 ranking, having demolished UCLA the previous week 33–0.  Oregon State held them scoreless, winning 10–0.

Oregon State had two weeks to prepare for Washington State, but it was not enough as the Cougars shut out the Beavers 7–0.  Over the next four weekends, Oregon State was a perfect 4–0, shutting out each opponent, and outscoring them a combined 85–0.  In the meantime, Stanford, who had clawed up to #6, lost a shocker to Washington State in California, putting Oregon State back in control of its own Rose Bowl destiny with only one week left in the Pacific Coast Conference season.  A Beaver victory would secure a Rose Bowl berth.  A loss would have muddled things.  Theoretically, a five-way tie could develop if Stanford somehow lost to California and Washington was able to beat the Trojans.  In such a situation, the league would vote on the representative.  Although Oregon State had the most conference victories, Oregon State and Stanford would be tied in conference losses.  The Indians could have been elected by the three other California schools to go.  However, the scenario seemed far-fetched at the time.

On the final weekend in November, the unthinkable happened.  California shocked Stanford, Washington knocked off the Trojans, and the Ducks hopped out to a 7–6 fourth-quarter lead against the Beavers.  Fullback Joe Day eliminated the debate with a 29-yard scamper with five minutes remaining to secure the Pacific Conference championship and Rose Bowl berth.  The final AP poll ranked Oregon State #12.

At the time, the Pacific Conference champion selected their opponent in the Rose Bowl.  #1 Minnesota was ineligible to play in a Bowl game due to Big Nine rules forbidding postseason games.  Duke would have been a logical second choice, but Coach Wallace Wade had rubbed a lot of Californians the wrong way due to his antics following Duke's 7–3 loss in the 1939 Rose Bowl. The Southern California media championed Missouri or Fordham.  Oregon State responded by inviting Fordham, with whom they had a history, but Fordham turned down the invitation to play against Missouri in the Sugar Bowl. Unable to invite their three first choices, the Beavers settled on number-two-ranked and undefeated Duke Blue Devils, much to the chagrin of Southern California.

On December 7, 1941, the United States was forced into World War II because of the surprise Japanese attack on Pearl Harbor.  On December 14, the Rose Bowl and the Rose  Parade were canceled, by order of the Army.  Many places offered to stage the event, including Norman, Oklahoma, and Atlanta, Georgia.  Soldier Field similarly extended invitations to both teams.  Instead, Duke invited the Beavers to make their own cross country trip to Durham, North Carolina, which Oregon State accepted.  Duke Stadium only sat 35,000, but an additional 20,000 seats were brought in for the game from North Carolina, North Carolina State, and Wake Forest.  56,000 people ultimately crammed in to watch.  Rarely getting a chance to see the Rose Bowl in its natural setting, scores of eastern and southern media also showed up.

Lon Stiner was new to the Rose Bowl, having never coached in one.  His only experience in a bowl was the 1940 Pineapple Bowl.  Duke was coached by Wallace Wade, for whom Duke Stadium was later renamed.  He had already coached in four Rose Bowls, posting a 2–1–1 record.  Both teams had impressive defenses.  Each had five shutouts, and no team had scored more than 14 points against either team.  However, the Blue Devils had the impressive offense, featuring quarterback James Thompson Prothro and were undefeated.  The 311 points they scored was second in the country.  Only two teams had stayed within 14 points.  They outscored their opponents 311–41, an average of 35–5.  Oregon State, on the other hand, had only outscored their opponents 123–33, an average victory of only 14–4.  The Beavers took the field as 3–1 underdogs.

Some Duke players insist that they played the game in a deluge; the Beaver players insist that it was merely misty.  Whatever the conditions, it was wet, favoring the Beavers.  The opening kickoff was mishandled by the Blue Devils and recovered by the Beavers, but Oregon State could not turn the opportunity into any points.  Later in the period, Oregon State's star, Donald Durdan, would break the scoreless tie with a 15-yard scamper.  The Blue Devils answered in the second quarter after Duke's star, Steve Lach ran untouched into the end zone on a reverse.  The first half ended with the score knotted at seven.

In the second half, the offenses shined for a brief moment.  Partway through the third quarter, Oregon State retook the lead when George Zellick scored on a 31-yard pass from Robert Dethman.  Duke immediately answered taking the kickoff and driving for a score to knot the game 14-all.  The Beavers quickly answered, when reserve halfback, Gene Gray, hauled in Robert Dethman's 40-yard bomb and outraced two Duke defenders the last 28-yards for the score.  Oregon State failed on the conversion though, leaving the door open for a Blue Devil comeback.

In the fourth quarter, the Beavers defense would bend but not break.  The 14 points represented the most points scored so far in the season on the Beaver defense, and they did not want to let down the offense which appeared content with 20.  Three times, Duke breached the Beaver 35 and three times they came up with no points.  One drive managed to break into the Beaver red zone, but George Peters managed to come up with an interception to preserve the lead.  The only points scored the rest of the game was by the Duke defense, a safety, when Don Durdan was tackled behind his own goal line after a bad snap from center.

The 20–16 upset victory sent shock waves throughout the country.  Most people south of the Mason-Dixon had expected an easy Duke victory.  Sid Feder of the Associated Press labeled it the biggest upset in the Rose Bowl's history.  The player of the game was probably Duke's Steve Lach, who rushed for 129 yards and averaged 47 yards a punt, but the honor went to Dan Durdan.  His 54 yards rushing and 44 yards per punt coupled with the Beaver's 20–16 victory carried the day.  The game was the first, last, and only Rose Bowl victory for Oregon State. It was also the only time the Rose Bowl wasn't played in southern California until the 2020 college football season, when Alabama and Notre Dame faced off at AT&T Stadium in Arlington, Texas.  It was also the last time Duke and Oregon State played each other on the gridiron.

World War II and Stiner's departure

Reality quickly set in.  Most of the players for both Duke and Oregon State served in World War II.  Duke and Oregon State each lost a halfback later in 1942 as Duke's Walter Griffith and Oregon State's Everett Smith made the ultimate sacrifice in the Pacific Theater.  The 1942 season proved disappointing; the Beavers could only muster a 4–5–1 season.  The final two games provided the only real highlights as the Beavers beat the Ducks 39–2, which would stand as the most one-sided Civil War until the 50–21 Oregon State win in 2004.  The season ended with an unexpected 7–7 tie with Michigan State in East Lansing, Michigan.

Oregon State did not field a team in 1943 and 1944.  In 1945, in order to keep costs low, the four Pacific Northwest teams played each other twice.  The Beavers went 3–3 in the six games, including a sweep of the Ducks, en route to a 4–4–1 record.  The Beavers started off poorly in 1946 with a 50–7 loss to UCLA in the Coliseum.  UCLA would go on to win the Pacific Coast championship.  Oregon State would not lose another game, finishing 7–1–1, including a 6–0 win over Southern California, the Beaver's only victory over the Trojans between 1935 and 1957.

Stiner's return
In 1947 and 1948, Oregon State posted a 10–9–3 record.  In 1947, Oregon State lost to Oregon, whose quarterback was one Norman Van Brocklin, but toppled Nebraska in Lincoln, Nebraska, 27–6.

In 1948, Oregon State jumped out to a 2–1–1 record before losing 42–0 to eventual Pacific Coast Champion, California.  It was Oregon State's third consecutive season with a six touchdown loss (albeit each loss was to the eventual Pacific Coast champion).  Oregon State had only experienced two more lopsided losses in their history.  After losing to California, the Beavers shut out UCLA in the Coliseum 28–0.  Following the victory, Oregon State went 0–2–2 with losses to Michigan State and Oregon and ties against Washington State and Utah.  The Beavers closed out the season by beating Nebraska for a second consecutive year, 28–12.  The loss to Oregon was particularly damaging.  Oregon had not won consecutive Civil Wars since they had won four-in-a-row from 1932 to 1935, and their win earned them a Cotton Bowl invitation.  Oregon State, on the other hand, packed for Hawaii and the Pineapple Bowl.

In the Pineapple Bowl, against the Hawaii Rainbows, Bob Krell recovered a fumble and intercepted a pass early in the game, which the Beavers turned into two quick scores: a one-yard run by Any Knuden and a short pass from halfback Ken Carpenter to Dick Twenge.  There was plenty of scoring but Oregon State prevailed 47–27.  The pass from Carpenter to Twenge would be one of five completed passes for the Beavers, albeit those five completions went for 112 yards.  The Beavers outrushed the Rainbows 287–256, but the Rainbows had more passing yards, total yards, and first downs.  The Pineapple Bowl was played until 1952 before being discontinued.

Following the bowl game, Lon Stiner was replaced as head coach by Kip Taylor.

Taylor years
Oregon State began the 1949 season 5–3. A notable win was the 63–14 victory over Montana. This was the last Beaver victory over conference rival Montana. Oregon State never lost to Montana in Montana's 26 seasons of Pacific Coast Conference football, although there were two ties.

Game nine for the Beavers was against the #8 Michigan State Spartans in Portland. Michigan State's two losses were to #1 Notre Dame and #5 Michigan. The Spartans were three-touchdown favorites and jumped out to a 13–0 lead. Oregon State cut the deficit to six early in the second quarter on a short run by Kenny Carpenter. The half ended with the score 13–7 in favor of the visitors.

Oregon State got the ball first in the second half and scored on their first possession on another Kenny Carpenter run. Lineman and kicker Stan McGuire's extra point attempt was no good. His 42-yard field goal attempt split the uprights. After the ensuing Michigan State drive stalled, Stan McGuire rushed through the Michigan State blockers and blocked the punt, which resulted in a safety and an 18–13 lead for the Beavers. Michigan State would hold and respond with a drive ending in a touchdown and a 20–18 lead. Oregon State scored one more touchdown, and Stan McGuire's extra point would cap the scoring for the game, a 25–20 Beaver victory. Stan McGuire was named lineman of the week for his play. His eight points single-handedly turned a Beaver loss into a Beaver victory. The following weekend, Oregon State beat Oregon in Eugene to finish 7–3. The year, however, would end in great sadness when Stan McGuire died in a car accident. He was named the captain of the 1950 season.

1950 started off in East Lansing, a 38–13 Michigan State victory; the magic was gone. From 1950 to 1954, Oregon State went 13–33.  Excluding the identical 4–1 records Kip Taylor put up against conference doormats Idaho and Oregon, the Beavers went 5–31 in the five-year stretch. One win was a 20–0 victory over independent Montana in 1950. It would be the last Beaver game against Montana for more than three decades.

In 1951, Oregon State parlayed a close loss against Michigan State and win over Utah into a #15 national ranking. After a win over Idaho, the #14 Trojans came to Portland to battle the Beavers; the Men of Troy left 28–6 victors. In 1952, a dejected 8000 watched Idaho manhandle Oregon State 27–6 in what proved to be Bell Field's final game. It was Idaho's first win over Oregon State since 1938 and their biggest since 1924.

In 1953, Oregon State failed to score a point until a 19–0 victory over Idaho in game number six. The next game was in East Lansing against #6 Michigan State, their first year in the Big Ten. The Spartans won 34–6. This was the final year in the six-year feud between the two teams. Michigan State went 5–1, but two of their victories came by a combined nine points. The teams have only played one game against each other since. Two weeks later, 13,500 showed up to watch Oregon State beat Washington State in the very first game at Parker Stadium (Home games since the Idaho loss had been played in Portland). In the Civil War, the Beavers' Tommy Little returned an interception 30 yards for the only touchdown in the Civil War, a 7–0 Oregon State victory.

In 1954, Oregon State won their first game against Idaho, 13–0, running their winning streak to three games. It was their longest winning streak since the final four games in 1949. They would not win another in 1954, losing eight straight, including a 33–14 loss against Oregon, snapping a five-game winning streak against the Ducks. The 14 points were the most the Beavers had scored all year.  Three days after the Civil War Kip Taylor resigned and was replaced by James Thompson "Tommy" Prothro, the assistant coach at UCLA and former quarterback for the Duke Blue Devils in the 1942 Rose Bowl.

Prothro years

The 10 Oregon State squads that coach Tommy Prothro put together were nicknamed the Black Bandits of Benton County. The Beavers immediately responded to the coaching change by beating Brigham Young and Stanford by a combined 43–0. The Beavers limped through a two-game trip to California, losing to the defending Pacific Coast Champion, UCLA, in the Coliseum, 38–0, and Pacific, 13–7. Oregon State welcomed the return to the Northwest, sweeping three games against Idaho and the Washington schools. The Beavers then traveled back to California, stealing one from California 16–14, Oregon State's first win in Berkeley since 1946. The win earned the Beavers a #19 AP ranking.  The following Saturday, Oregon ended Oregon State's four-game winning streak. However, the 6–3 record was the Beavers' best in six years.

Starting in January, slush funds were uncovered at Washington, UCLA, Southern California, and California. The slush funds were used to pay recruits, players, and ringers. Some of the funds had been in operation since the 1920s, making Oregon State's accomplishments from the 1920s to the 1950s all the more amazing. Southern California, UCLA, and Washington were all put on multi-year probation.

It is widely believed that Red Sanders had imported the idea that collegiate players were really semipro athletes from Vanderbilt, when UCLA hired him as their head coach in 1949. He quickly turned a struggling UCLA team into a juggernaut, compiling a 66–19–1 record. Many of the other schools were forced to engage in the same type of gross rules violations merely to stay competitive. When Oregon went on probation in 1951 for paying recruits and players, they invited the Pacific Coast Conference to investigate UCLA.

Oregon State faced a daunting schedule in 1956; their first three games were on the road against Missouri, Southern California, and Iowa. Since the Rose Bowl in 1942, Oregon State had only posted one win east of the Mountain Time Zone. The trip to Missouri, however, ended well, a 19–13 Beaver upset victory. Oregon State then traveled southwest to the Coliseum against the #6 Trojans.  Southern California, coming off a 44–20 victory over Texas in Austin, Texas, were 19-point favorites. The Trojans left the Coliseum the victors with a 21–13 win. The final game in the three-game swing was against #20 Iowa. Oregon State bolted out to a 13–0 lead, but Iowa scored two fourth-quarter touchdowns to nip Oregon State, 14–13.

The Beavers rebounded in Corvallis. California bolted out to a 13–0 lead, but Oregon State scored 21 unanswered points to win 21–13.  The Beavers continued winning, beating Washington State 21–0.  After the win, UCLA came to Corvallis with a 19-game Pacific Coast Conference winning streak. Oregon State won 21–7 on three one-yard Tom Berry touchdowns.  The Beavers then beat Washington.

On November 10, #14 Oregon State traveled to California to play #20 Stanford. The winner would control its own Rose Bowl destiny.  The Indians scored a touchdown late in the third quarter to take a 19–7 lead. In the fourth quarter, the Beavers' Paul Lowe scored from nine yards out to cut the Indian lead to 19–14.  After a Tom Berry interception, Joe Francis found Frank Negri for a touchdown, which clinched a 20–19 Oregon State victory. 65,000 turned out in what would be the most attended Oregon State win.  The game would remain the most attended Oregon State victory for more than four decades.

Oregon State needed only a win over Idaho or Oregon to clinch a Rose Bowl berth. Sportswriters did not expect much from the Vandals, but Idaho was looking to pull one of the biggest upsets in Pacific Coast Conference history and took a 10–7 lead midway through the fourth quarter. With time running out, Earnel Durden hauled in a 60-yard pass from Paul Lowe to Idaho's 13. On fourth down and two at Idaho's five with just over two minutes remaining, rather than kick a tying field goal, Oregon State went for it. Lowe punched it in from five yards out. By virtue of their sixth victory, Oregon State clinched a Rose Bowl berth, since no team off of probation could catch them.

NBC, looking to cash in on Oregon State's Rose Bowl run, ran the Beaver's final game, the Civil War, nationally. It was Oregon State's first game on television. After the second half kickoff, Earnel Durden, one of the two Beaver All-Americans was ejected for trading punches with Oregon's Spike Hillstrom. The Beavers and Ducks ended the game knotted at 14 after a late Oregon touchdown.  Further South, the Trojans' upset victory over the Bruins ensured there would be no co-champion.

Oregon State's Rose Bowl opponent was #3 Iowa. Iowa's only loss was to Michigan, who wound up #7 in the country. Following the loss, Iowa shut out #6 and undefeated Minnesota and #6 Ohio State in consecutive weekends; the following weekend, they beat Notre Dame 48–8. The Rose Bowl featured the first match-up of two teams that had played each other earlier in the same season. It was Oregon State's first trip to the Rose Bowl in Pasadena, California. It would not prove as enjoyable as the Durham, North Carolina, version.

On their first two drives, Oregon State drove into Iowa territory. Each drive ended with a fumble that was turned into a Hawkeye touchdown. With 7:20 left in the first quarter, the Hawkeyes were up 14–0. After trading touchdowns in the second quarter, Iowa went into the locker rooms up 21–6 at halftime. In the third quarter, Iowa's Mike Hagler scored on a 66-yard double reverse, which put the game out of reach. The Beavers made a game rally, but the Hawkeyes held on for a 35–19 victory. Oregon State's three fumbles and poor tackling are generally cited as keys to the loss.

In the off-season, the membership of each of the three teams on probation was put to a vote. Southern California and Washington each received nine votes in favor of membership. UCLA's vote was much closer. On one side were the four slush fund teams—California, Southern California, UCLA, and Washington—each campaigning for UCLA's membership. On the other side were Oregon and Washington State, who were each pushing for UCLA to be expelled from the conference, due to their failing to make any worthwhile changes. Idaho and Stanford lined up behind Oregon and Washington State, making Oregon State the deciding vote. Whether Tommy Prothro helped sway Oregon State on the positives of his former employer is unknown, but Oregon State was the only team to break rank and vote with the slush fund teams to keep UCLA a member of the Pacific Coast Conference.

In 1957, for the second consecutive year, Oregon State played its first three games outside of Corvallis. The first game pitted the #13 Beavers and the #19 Trojans in Portland, Oregon. Oregon State prevailed 20–0. Nub Beamer scored two touchdowns. The most spectacular play was a 44-yard touchdown run by Dwayne Fournier on a double reverse. The Beavers' defense held the Trojans to 170 yards. It was the Beavers' first win over the Trojans in 11 years.

Games in Lawrence, Kansas, and Evanston, Illinois, both ended in Beaver victories by a combined 56–19 margin. The wins propelled Oregon State to a #7 ranking. The Beavers would beat Idaho 20–0, which ran their unbeaten regular season streak to 11, Oregon State's longest such streak since 1915. The Beavers concluded October by traveling to the Coliseum and Seattle, Washington, each game ending in a loss.

After the consecutive losses to UCLA and Washington, Oregon State beat Washington State, California, and Stanford. At the time, there was a no-repeat rule in the Pacific Coast Conference, which precluded Oregon State from playing in the Rose Bowl. As such, the Beavers win over Stanford and the Duck's win over the Trojans clinched a Rose Bowl berth for Oregon. Both teams would play the Civil War purely for pride. The unranked Beavers and #15 Ducks both came out firing, each scoring on their opening possession. No scoring would follow until late in the third quarter, when the Beavers' Ted Searle, split the uprights for a 10–7 lead. The Ducks would have a chance to go ahead, but Nub Beamer stripped Oregon's Jim Shanley near the goal line and came up with the ensuing fumble. Oregon would go on to lose to the #1 Ohio State Buckeyes by an identical 10–7 score.

In the off-season California, Southern California, and UCLA convinced Washington to leave the Pacific Coast Conference with them.  This put Stanford in an awkward situation. They could remain in a conference featuring Idaho, Oregon, Oregon State, and Washington State with an expiring Rose Bowl contract, or they could join the slush fund schools in a new conference and, in all probability keep the Rose Bowl contract.

In 1958, Oregon State started off the season ranked #12, their highest ranking to start a season in 16 years. The Trojans quickly pushed them out of the polls with a 21–0 victory in the Coliseum. The following day, team co-captain, Buzz Randall, died of leukemia.  The Beavers went 6–3 the rest of 1958, including a 14–8 comeback victory over California, the eventual Pacific Coast champion.

In the off-season, Stanford joined the slush fund teams in a vote to dissolve the Pacific Coast Conference. The five created a new conference known as the Athletic Association of Western Universities, or the Big Five. The Rose Bowl was still under contract with the Pacific Coast Conference and committed itself to selecting the champion of the non-existent conference. A contract with the Big Five was signed for the 1961 Rose Bowl onward.

Newly independent Oregon State started 2–7 in 1959. The last game pitted the Beavers and #15 Ducks in Eugene, Oregon. Oregon had a 7–0 lead in the first seven minutes of the game. Oregon State drove 52 yards to cut the lead to 7–6 on Don Kasso's touchdown. The Beavers' Amos Marsh kicked a field goal to take a 9–7 lead. Oregon State's Jim Stinnette capped scoring on a fourth-quarter touchdown plunge, which gave the Beavers a 15–7 win, knocking the Ducks out of the Rose Bowl race. In early 1960, Tommy Prothro convinced basketball standout, Terry Baker, to join the football team.

Oregon State started the 1960 season by traveling to the Coliseum to play the #6 Trojans. The Trojans were the defending Big Five champion and the Beavers had not beaten the Trojans in the Coliseum since 1935; Southern California had outscored Oregon State 302–72 during that span. Despite recent history, the Beavers shocked the Trojans 14–0, scoring touchdowns on the first possession of both halves. The win propelled Oregon State to a #10 ranking. The following weekend in Iowa City, Iowa, the Beavers fell to #19 Iowa 22–12, knocking Oregon State out of the polls.

After the loss in Iowa, Oregon State won three straight games, including a 20–6 win over Indiana in Bloomington, Indiana, the first-ever game in Memorial Stadium, still the home of the Indiana Hoosiers. In Portland, Oregon, the Beavers, behind Terry Baker's two first-quarter touchdowns, hopped out to a 22–7 second half lead over the Huskies. Washington outscored Oregon State 23–7 to win 30–29, but Baker broke the Beavers' all-time total offense record, which he had set the previous week. After the close loss, Oregon State went 2–1 against Washington State and the Bay Area schools.

In the season finale, the Beavers' Tim Ankerson missed a 24-yard field goal with 19 seconds left to seal a 14–14 tie in Corvallis against the #19 Ducks. The Beavers went 2–2 against the Big Five, losing against California and Washington by a combined nine points.  The 6–3–1 record earned Oregon State a Gotham Bowl invitation, which was to be held in Yankee Stadium. They were slated to play Holy Cross. Upon receiving Oregon State's acceptance, Holy Cross was uninvited. Despite attempting to invite Colorado, Syracuse, Tennessee, and Holy Cross a second time, no opponent was ever found. Oregon State did not make the trip and the 1960 game was never played. The Gotham Bowl managed to put on bowl games after the 1961 and 1962 seasons before folding.

Terry Baker accounted for 1473 yards in 1960 as a backup single wing halfback, a Beaver record. In 1961, in order to maximize Terry Baker's talent, Tommy Prothro scrapped the single wing offense in favor of the T formation and installed Terry Baker as quarterback.  Oregon State College also became Oregon State University. The first game pitted #10 Syracuse and #17 Oregon State in Portland, Oregon. The game featured two future Heisman winners. Ernie Davis and Terry Baker accounted for 18 of the 27 points scored, a 19–8 Syracuse victory. Syracuse would go on to win the 1961 Liberty Bowl.

Oregon State went 4–3 in the following seven games, including a 24–23 loss in Tempe, Arizona, on a miraculous two-point conversion in the Beavers' first game against the Sun Devils. In the Civil War, Oregon State's Tom Gates scored a first half touchdown for a 6–0 lead. In the second half, a long snap on a punt sailed through the Beaver end zone for a safety, cutting Oregon State's lead to four. After the free kick, the Ducks drove to the one-yard line, but the Beavers stopped Mel Renfro on fourth down. Oregon's last hope ended when Oregon State's Bill Monk intercepted Renfro at the Beaver 30. Oregon State won 6–2. The Beavers split with the Big Five.  Terry Baker finished 11th in the nation in total offense. In the off-season, Washington State joined the Big Five, creating the Big Six.

The first four games of 1962 were away from Corvallis. The first featured Iowa State in Portland, Oregon. The game was a passing of the torch of sorts, featuring the 1961 total offense leader, Iowa State's Dave Hoppman, and the 1962 total offense leader to be, Oregon State's Terry Baker. Iowa State hopped out to a 28–13 lead in the third quarter, but Terry Baker led the Beavers back on two touchdown runs and a touchdown pass to take a brief 33–28 lead. After Iowa State scored again to post a 35–33 lead, Terry Baker hurled a touchdown pass to Jerry Neil with 29 seconds left for a 39–35 victory.

The following weekend, the Beavers fell to Iowa 28–8 in Iowa City, Iowa. In the first weekend in October, Oregon State traveled south to Stanford to take on the #12 Indians. The Beavers left 27–0 winners. The following Friday, the Columbus Day Storm, the strongest 20th century extratropical cyclone in the United States, struck. The following day, Oregon State met #7 Washington in Portland, Oregon, despite the stadium being without both power and hot water. Oregon State built a 13–7 lead behind two second quarter Vern Burke touchdowns. With less than three minutes left, the Huskies' Charlie Mitchell scampered in from two yards out en route to a 14–13 victory. The narrow defeat would be the Beavers’ last in 1962.

At the end of October, during the Cuban Missile Crisis, #19 West Virginia came to Portland, Oregon. The Beavers pummeled the Mountaineers 51–22. Following two wins on the Palouse, against Idaho and Washington State, and a win in Corvallis against Colorado State, Oregon State climbed to #18.

At the end of November, Oregon came to Corvallis. The Ducks were 6–2–1. Their two losses were in Columbus, Ohio, and Austin, Texas, against the Buckeyes and the undefeated Southwest Conference Champion Longhorns. The winner would clinch the best record in the state. The Beavers struck first on a three-yard touchdown pass from Terry Baker to Vern Burke on the first play of the second quarter to put Oregon State up 6–0. The catch was Vern Burke's 69th reception, the most in college football history. It also put him over 1,000 yards receiving, which was the first time a receiver had accomplished the feat.  Oregon scored 17 straight points to post a 17–6 halftime lead.  The Beavers took the second half kickoff and drove 65-yards for a touchdown to pull within a score. The Oregon State defense held Oregon to a 36 yards of second half offense to keep the Beavers within four. In the waning seconds, Terry Baker threw a 13-yard fourth down pass to Danny Espalin to win the game for the Beavers, 20–17. At game's end, he had amassed 4,980 yards in total offense, the second most in college football history. His 2276 total yards in 1962 were the second most ever and the most that year by more than three football fields.  His teammates carried him off the field.

November 27, 1962 was an auspicious day for Oregon State. The Beavers accepted a bid to play in Philadelphia, Pennsylvania against the Villanova Wildcats in the Liberty Bowl. Terry Baker also was informed that he had won the Heisman Trophy, becoming the first player west of the Pecos River to win the award. On his trip East, he met John F. Kennedy in Philadelphia. The award was presented in New York City by Robert F. Kennedy.

Ten days later, Oregon State took the field against Villanova. The Beavers, with Terry Baker, were the clear favorites, but the Wildcats were no pushover. Oregon State and Villanova shared identical 7–2 records. The Wildcats out-sized Oregon State at most positions, and they also had more bowl experience. They were the defending Sun Bowl champions. In an era of only 11 bowl games, winning a bowl game was quite an achievement. Finally, the game was played in Villanova's backyard, 30 minutes to the southeast in Philadelphia Municipal Stadium.

The temperature was 17 degrees at kickoff, keeping all but 17,048 from showing up in the 105,000-seat stadium. However, 27 million watched on television. If the game were held in 2007, it would have been the fourth most watched bowl game. Villanova got the first break of the game in the first quarter when William Sherlock's 52-yard punt was downed nine inches from the Oregon State end zone by Larry Glueck. The Wildcats stacked the box with eight men, expecting something up the middle; however, Terry Baker took it around the left end. He shook off two Villanova defenders in the end zone and broke away. At the seven, he paid back Glueck with a stiff arm at the seven. From there, he turned on the afterburners and outran the Wildcats down the field for a touchdown. Baker's two-point pass was broken up, keeping the score 6–0. The 99-yard run remains the longest play from scrimmage in bowl and Oregon State history.

The Wildcats responded by marching into the Beaver red zone, but the Beaver defense forced a turnover to end the threat. Villanova spent most of the game marching between the twenties. At some point in each Villanova drive, Oregon State's defense would eventually stiffen and stop the Wildcats. Villanova's last threat began when they broke into the Beavers’ red zone with a few minutes left. They made their way down to the 11 before the Beavers' Paul Seale recovered a Wildcat fumble at the Beaver 8 with 2:47 left to extinguish the Wildcats’ chances. Villanova wound up outgaining Oregon State 309–299 with 20 first downs to the Beavers’ 11. The Beavers defense forced six Wildcat turnovers. Baker wound up rushing for 137 yards and passing for 123 yards. The 260 yards accounted for 87% of Oregon State's offense. The win remains the easternmost Beaver victory since the 1933 win over Fordham.

In January, Terry Baker was named Sports Illustrated's Sportsman of the Year, becoming the only Heisman Trophy winner to win the award. Other winners in the 1960s include Arnold Palmer, Sandy Koufax, Carl Yastrzemski, and Bill Russell. Sonny Liston was under strong consideration for the award in 1962. Later in 1963, Terry Baker was the starting point guard on the Oregon State basketball team, which made it to the Final Four, becoming the only Heisman winner to ever do so. The last Liberty Bowl held in Philadelphia was in 1963. In 1964, organizers moved the game indoors in Atlantic City, NJ.  In 1965, the game was moved to Memphis, Tennessee, where it has been played ever since.

1963 started well for Oregon State, with the Beavers outscoring Colorado and Utah a combined 70–20. The quick start propelled Oregon State to a #22 ranking. #14 Baylor came to Portland, Oregon, in early October to play the undefeated Beavers. Gordon Queen threw a nine-yard touchdown pass to Dan Espalin with 27 seconds left to lead Oregon State to victory, 22–15, to stretch their winning streak to 10, the Beavers’ longest-ever streak. Baylor would go on to win the Bluebonnet Bowl. The following weekend, Oregon State traveled to Seattle, Washington, to play Washington. The Huskies won 34–7. The win helped propel Washington to a Big Six championship and Rose Bowl berth.  Oregon State meanwhile lost four of their final six games to finish 5–5. The Beavers split in its games with the Big Six.

On March 31, 1964, Oregon and Oregon State were unanimously invited to join the Athletic Association of Western Universities. The first four games of 1964 were away from Corvallis. The first was in Evanston, Illinois, which ended in a 7–3 Northwestern victory.  However, the Beavers found more success in Boulder, Colorado, and Waco, Texas, against Colorado and Baylor with two seven point victories.

In the conference opener against Washington in Portland, Oregon, Oregon State paid Washington back with a 9–7 victory. In the first game in Corvallis, Oregon State defeated Idaho 10–7. The 4–1 start earned the Beavers a #17 ranking. Oregon State defeated #8 Syracuse 31–13 in Portland, Oregon, paying back the Orangemen for a 31–8 victory the year before in New York.

The following two weeks, Oregon State beat Washington State and Indiana by double digits. The wins propelled the Beavers to #8, but the next Saturday, Stanford beat Oregon State in California, 16–7. The final scheduled game was the Civil War. #10 Oregon was 7–1–1, a win away from their best season in more than three decades. Oregon State, on the other hand, was a win away from a conference championship. With a win and a Bruin-Trojan tie, the Beavers would be headed to the Rose Bowl. The 1964 Civil War featured the two best Oregon teams in more than three decades. It was the most attended game ever in Corvallis, Oregon.

In the first half, Oregon scored a touchdown to take an early 6–0 lead, but Al East blocked the extra point. With 54 seconds left in the game, Oregon State's Booker Washington scored his only collegiate touchdown from one-yard out. Steve Clark added the extra point for a 7–6 Beaver win. However, the Trojans defeated the Bruins, which knotted the Beavers and Trojans atop the conference. The conference vote likewise was knotted, four votes apiece. The Beavers had a better record and a better record against the Big Ten (by virtue of their 24–14 win over Indiana in Corvallis). The tiebreaker in such an instance was to eliminate the team that had more recently gone to the Rose Bowl, and Southern California had gone two years prior.

Oregon State's opponent was the #4 Michigan Wolverines. Michigan had beaten two top 10 teams in the year, and their only loss was by a single point to Purdue. Oregon State started the game as two touchdown underdogs. Oregon State's second January trip to Southern California would not be as enjoyable as the first. Winning the conference by tiebreaker over the Trojans was extremely unpopular in Southern California. The reception was less than warm for the players and fans. Partway through the game, play was suspended because an upset Trojan set off a smoke bomb on the field.

The game started off well for Oregon State. The scoreless tie was broken in the second quarter when Oregon State's Doug McDougal hauled in a five-yard pass from Paul Brothers, capping an 84-yard drive. However, the score merely seemed to wake Michigan from their slumber. The Wolverines scored twice on 40+ yard runs to take a 12–7 lead at halftime. Michigan tacked on two more touchdowns in the third quarter to take a 27–7 lead, putting the game out of reach. The Wolverines added a fifth touchdown in the fourth quarter, making the final score 34–7.

Shortly after the game ended, Tommy Prothro accepted the head coaching job at UCLA, leaving Oregon State without a coach.

Andros years
Oregon State hired the head coach of Idaho as their new head coach, Demosthenes Konstandies Andrecopoulos, better known as Dee Andros. Dee Andros was a rather large fellow and led the team onto the field, often wearing a bright orange jacket. He quickly earned the nickname, "The Great Pumpkin." Andros was a Marine war hero, having earned a Bronze Star for spending more than a month under fire on Iwo Jima.

The biggest win for Dee Andros in 1965 was recruiting Steve Preece. Preece had great speed (10.0 in the 100 yard dash), and a good arm, a great fit for the option offense. Linebackers Coach Ed Knecht, who had connections in Southwestern Idaho, received a phone call warning him that a rival school was attempting to steal Preece away from the Beavers, so Knecht promptly called new head coach Dee Andros with the news. Andros responded, "Get the $@%! over there. And if you don't get him, don't bother to come back."

In 1965, Oregon State faced a daunting schedule, seven away games. The first was in Champaign, Illinois, against Illinois. Trailing 10–6 with less than three minutes left at the Illinois 10, Paul Brothers lofted a pass to Clayton Calhoun, who was triple teamed.  The three defenders managed to deflect the pass, but Calhoun came up with the ball in the end zone for a 12–10 Beaver victory.  Oregon State went 4–5 the rest of the season. One of the highlights was a road victory over Syracuse in Syracuse, New York, by a single point, the Beavers' easternmost victory between their two victories in Philadelphia, Pennsylvania. Oregon State won after Paul Brothers threw an eight-yard fourth-quarter touchdown pass to Fred Schweer. The Beaver defense managed to contain a Syracuse backfield featuring two college football hall of famers, Larry Csonka and Floyd Little.

The 1966 season began in Ann Arbor, Michigan, a 41–0 loss to Michigan. The following weekend, in Iowa City, Iowa, Oregon State finally beat Iowa 17–3. The game of the year was on the first day of October, when the #5 Trojans came to Portland, Oregon, and left with a 21–0 victory. The Beavers split with Idaho and Northwestern before traveling to Tempe, Arizona, to play Arizona State. Down 17–12 in the second half, Oregon State's Pete Pifer plowed in from one yard out over Arizona State's Bob Rokita. Along with playing defensive tackle, Rokita was Arizona State's starting kicker. After Pifer's run put the Beavers up 18–17, Rokita was unable to return to kick a 43-yard field goal. His backup's attempt fell short. After beating the Sun Devils, the Beavers posted four consecutive victories, including a win over Arizona in Portland, Oregon. The wins over the Arizona schools were the first victories over the future conference rivals. Another auspicious victory was the 24–13 win over Washington. It was the first time the Huskies had played a game in Oregon south of Portland in 42 years. They have not played in Portland since. Oregon State finished tied for second place in the AAWU with UCLA, but they finished tied with both the Bruins and Trojans in conference losses, so the conference could have voted them in over Southern California. However, the 21–0 loss to the Trojans and the 1965 Rose Bowl vote all-but eliminated them from getting the nod over Southern California. In the end, the Trojans got the nod because they were conference champions, had lost the 1965 Rose Bowl bid to the Beavers, and were considered to be healthier than UCLA.

1967 season
Nobody expected much out of the Beavers in 1967; even the Oregon State media guide said that the Beavers would be "rebuilding" in 1967. Paul Brothers, who led Oregon State to the 1965 Rose Bowl as a sophomore graduated in 1966. Dee Andros gave the starting job to Steve Preece, the wunderkind Andros had recruited from Idaho shortly after he took the head coaching job at Oregon State. Another newcomer was Bill "Earthquake" Enyart, a converted linebacker, who replaced Voit and Pop Warner Award Winner Pete Pifer at fullback.

Oregon State started off the season in Portland, Oregon, against the Stanford Indians. Two second quarter Mike Haggard field goals were the difference in the Beavers building a 13–7 fourth-quarter lead. With 1:25 left, Skip Vanderbundt made a key interception at the Beaver 16 to preserve the 13–7 win. Battling 100-degree heat, Oregon State held on to defeat Arizona State the following weekend, 27–21.  It was the Sun Devils' biggest loss in 1967. In Iowa City, Iowa, the following weekend, Oregon State jumped out to a 38–6 lead and held on to win 38–18. The nine-game winning streak was the nation's longest.

The following weekend, Oregon State attempted to run its winning streak to ten games in Seattle, Washington. The game was ominous because Oregon State's ten-game winning streak in 1963 ended in Seattle. Oregon State intercepted Washington in the end zone on the Huskies opening drive and drove 80 yards for a 6–0 lead. Washington would tie the game before halftime and win on an 18-yard run with two minutes left. The following weekend, reeling from the late game loss and looking forward to a trip to West Lafayette, Indiana, against #2 Purdue, Oregon State gave up four touchdowns against Brigham Young in a 31–13 loss. The Beavers only allowed five touchdowns the rest of the year.

The following weekend, Oregon State traveled to Indiana to play Purdue. Purdue was a 20-point favorite, the defending Rose Bowl champions and had won nine straight. In their first four games, the Boilermakers had defeated Texas A&M and Ohio State on the road and #1 Notre Dame in West Lafayette, Indiana.  Their star was running back/cornerback Marvin Leroy Keyes. Keyes would go on to finish third in the 1967 Heisman Race and second in the 1968 Heisman Race. In both years, he was an All-American at both running back and cornerback. He appeared on the cover of Sports Illustrated's 1968 college football preview. In 1987, he was voted Purdue's "All-Time Greatest Player." In 2004, College Football News ranked him the 86th best college football player ever.

The Purdue faithful did not think Oregon State had much of a chance, erecting tombstones with Beaver players' names on them. The Oregon State coaches made sure to take the team bus past the tombstones the day before the game. The Beavers struck first, driving 82 yards on their first possession. Purdue immediately responded by driving 62-yards to knot things up at seven.  Keyes supplied the last seven yards to paydirt. Late in the first half, Oregon State recovered a Purdue fumble at the Purdue 26, which led to a 26-yard field goal by Mike Haggard. Oregon State went into halftime 30 minutes away from pulling off the upset.

Purdue took the lead for the first time, 14–10, in the third quarter on a 15-yard run by Keyes after a 65-yard drive.  The Boilermakers would not breach the Beaver 40 for the rest of the game. Late in the period, Haggard kicked a 32-yard field goal to pull within 14–13. For most of the fourth quarter, Oregon State labored under a one-point deficit. However, with 6:35 left, Jess Lewis gave the Beavers the ball at the Boilermaker 30 after recovering his second fumble of the game. It took Oregon State less than three minutes to traverse the 30 yards. Earthquake Enyart rumbled in from four yards out to take a 19–14 lead with 3:54 left. On the ensuing kickoff, Haggard was instructed to kick it away from Keyes. He complied by lofting the ball. Purdue could not manage to field the kickoff and Oregon State's Mel Easley recovered at the Purdue 28. Haggard would go on to kick a 38-yard field goal to take a 22–14 lead with 1:06 left. Any hopes for a Purdue comeback were squashed when Mike Groff intercepted a pass on Purdue's first play from scrimmage.

Oregon State held Keyes to 74 yards rushing. Both Steve Preece and Earthquake Enyart outrushed him. Purdue would go on to win their next four games before losing a road game against Indiana, who wound up #4 in the final AP Poll. Purdue wound up #9, finishing as Big Ten co-champions with Indiana and Minnesota. Not knowing that more would come, 2000 people turned out at the Corvallis Airport to welcome the team home. The following weekend, Washington State came to Corvallis, Oregon. Oregon State put up 21 first half points.  In the second half, Washington State came out motivated. They scored on their first possession and blocked an Oregon State punt, recovering at Oregon State's four. In four tries, they did not manage to notch a single yard. After stopping the Cougars, the Beavers did not look back, scoring two late touchdowns to win 35–7.

On the first Saturday in November, #15 Oregon State traveled to the Coliseum to take on #2 UCLA. Oddsmakers initially made the Bruins a 13-point favorite but gamblers loaded up on the upset-minded Beavers. At kickoff, the spread was a mere seven points. UCLA, coming off of a bye, had two weeks to prepare for Oregon State. The Bruins had faced a difficult schedule. They started off the season defeating #3 Tennessee 20–16. They had also had made two separate trips to Pennsylvania, defeating Pittsburgh by 32 points and Penn State, who wound up #10 in the final AP Poll, by two points.

The star for UCLA was quarterback Gary Beban, who would go on to win the 1967 Heisman Trophy. He and their three All-Conference linemen were the biggest reasons the Bruins were averaging 31 points an outing, averaging victories over their opponents by more than 15 points a game. There was no All-Conference selection for kicker in 1967, but UCLA's Zenon Andrusyshyn almost certainly would have been the All-Conference selection. The tilt was the first Oregon State-UCLA game since they were both members of the Pacific Coast Conference. It was also the first time Oregon State had squared off against their old coach, Tommy Prothro.

Less than three minutes in, Earthquake Enyart plowed into the end zone from a yard out, capping off a 38-yard drive, which began after a fumbled punt. UCLA's only threat in the quarter ended when Zenon Andrusyshyn's 42-yard attempt sailed wide right.  Early in the second quarter, UCLA extinguished another Oregon State threat, stopping Enyart six inches short of the goal line on fourth-and-goal (although both Preece and Enyart continue to believe that Enyart crossed the goal line).  The near miss reinvigorated UCLA, which drove 99 yards for the equalizer. Andrusyshyn made two field goals in the quarter to help UCLA go up 13–7 at halftime.

Late in the third quarter, Oregon State scored a touchdown, when Billy Main scampered in from nine yards out. However, Haggard's extra point hit the left upright, keeping the score knotted at 13. In the fourth quarter, UCLA put together a 71-yard drive, aided by an inadvertent whistle, which nullified a Bruin fumble. UCLA had to settle for a 26-yard field goal after Oregon State's defense stiffened. UCLA threatened to put the game away with about two minutes left, but Mark Waletich intercepted a Beban pass in the end zone. In 45 seconds, Oregon State drove 69 yards. However, they faced a decision on fourth and a long four from UCLA's 11.  The Beavers decided to kick the field goal, knotting the score at 16 with 1:14 left. UCLA responded by driving down to the 23-yard line.  UCLA sent Andrusyshyn onto the field, but Ron Boley managed to bat down the kick with less than 10 seconds left, preserving the 16–16 tie. The 16 points were the fewest UCLA had scored in 1967. 1000 fans turned out to welcome Oregon State back home.

The game had barely ended when Dee Andros began being assailed by questions about Oregon State's chances against the #1 Trojans. He finally grew sick of it and said, "I'm tired of playing these number two ranked teams. Bring on number one." The following weekend, he got his wish. The #1 Trojans were a juggernaut. In the 1960s, Southern California would finish no worse than second in their conference, winning six conference championships, playing in five Rose Bowls, and winning two national championships. The 1967 Trojans may have been the best Trojan team in the decade. Sporting News ranked 1967 Southern California as the #9 team of the 20th century. Their non-conference schedule included #1 Notre Dame in South Bend, Indiana; #3 Michigan State in East Lansing, Michigan; and #4 Texas in the Coliseum. Southern California started off the non-conference slate with a 17–13 win over Texas in the Coliseum.  Then, they traveled to East Lansing, Michigan, to defeat Michigan State 21–17. In the Battle for the Jeweled Shillelagh, the Trojans defeated the Irish 24–7 in South Bend, Indiana. The 17-point loss served as the largest margin of defeat the Irish would endure in South Bend, Indiana, between 1963 and 1979. When Southern California rolled into Corvallis, they were averaging winning every game by more than 20 points against one of the hardest schedules ever compiled.

Southern California's two biggest stars were right tackle Ron Yary and halfback O. J. Simpson. Yary was the best lineman in the country and would win the Outland Trophy at the end of the year. O. J. Simpson led the country with 1050 rushing yards. He would go on to finish second on Heisman ballots in 1967 and would win the trophy in 1968. Both players would wind up as the first overall pick of the NFL draft after each of their senior seasons, and each would enter both the College Football and Pro Football Hall of Fames.

The game was highly anticipated. California governor Ronald Reagan and Oregon governor Tom McCall made the trip. Ronald Reagan had famously said he would handpick a box of oranges if Oregon State won. Tom McCall turned the boast into a bet when he offered to put up a freshly caught silver salmon against Ronald Reagan's handpicked box of oranges. The game was held on Veteran's Day, so, along with the two governors, ten generals and admirals, including Lt. General Jimmy Doolittle; three Congressional Medal of Honor recipients; and the Air Force Academy Drum and Bugle Corps were on hand. 41,494 fans filled the 40,750-seat stadium. It was the most-attended single sporting event in the history of Oregon. The weather, which became a topic of contention after the fact, was pretty mundane for a November in Oregon. From the eighth to the 11th only .83" of rain fell and not a drop fell during the contest. At kickoff the #1 Trojans were 11-point favorites over the #13 Beavers.

On the Trojans' first play from scrimmage, O. J. Simpson quickly showed he was worthy of Heisman consideration, rushing for 40 yards around left end. However, the Trojans were forced to settle for a 36-yard field goal attempt, which sailed wide right. The Trojans never got any closer to the Beaver end zone. By the end of the first quarter, O. J. Simpson had already rushed for 87 yards. Early in the second quarter, the Juice finally broke loose. He shook off a tackler at the Trojan 37 and steamed upfield with three blockers to lead him. He only had one man to beat, Mark Waletich.  Simpson slowed down to allow his blockers dispatch the overmatched defender. Out of nowhere, Jess Lewis closed on Simpson, eventually dragging O. J. down from behind at the Beaver 32. Southern California would get eight yards on the next three plays.  Rather than attempt a 41-yard field goal, the Trojans went for it, but Ron Boley tackled the Trojans' quarterback, Steve Sogge, for no gain. Later in the second quarter, Oregon State's Skip Vanderbundt came up with a Southern California fumble at the Trojan 47. Over the next eight plays, the Beavers rushed for 34 yards all on running plays by Earthquake Enyart, Steve Preece, and Billy Main. On fourth-and-three at the Trojan 13, Mike Haggard's 30 yarder split the uprights for a 3–0 lead. Later in the first half, Mike Haggard's second attempt from 28 yards sailed wide right. The half ended with a 3–0 Oregon State lead.

In the third quarter, Oregon State's Enyart took off from the Beaver 24 and was not caught until he reached the Trojans' 19. When he was tackled, Enyart fumbled. The fumble was recovered by Southern California's team captain, Adrian Young, the All-American linebacker. As the game wore on, both defenses only seemed to get stronger. Early in the fourth quarter, Southern California faced a third-and-two at its own 23. Ron Boley dropped Steve Sogge for a loss. Later in the quarter, the Trojans had their best scoring opportunity of the second half, when they faced third-and-one at Oregon State's 42. Boley again tackled Sogge in the backfield for a two-yard loss. Oregon State's returner, Charlie Olds, received the ensuing punt at the Beaver nine and raced downfield.  He was hit at the Trojan 35-yard line and fumbled. The ball bounced near Olds but not near enough to recover the fumble. Instead, Olds batted the ball out of bounds. The referees called a penalty for illegal batting, which was a personal foul, penalized by an automatic change of possession. Southern California was unable to generate a first down on the drive. In the last 44 minutes of the game, the Trojans managed just three first downs and only crossed midfield twice. Perhaps the best boost for the defense was the punting of Gary Houser. Southern California did not start a drive beyond their own 35 all game long. With three minutes left, Simpson fumbled.  It proved to be his final carry. He ended with 188 yards rushing but, more importantly, no touchdowns. Fittingly, Jess Lewis came up with the fumble. Oregon State's offense was so enthused that they managed their only first downs of the second half, which enabled the Beavers to run out the clock.

The 3–0 loss was the last time the Trojans would be shut out until they went on probation in 1983. Oregon State's 2–0–1 record remains the best record against three top two teams in the same season. It is unclear whether Tom McCall ever received the box of oranges Ronald Reagan had promised to hand-pick. UCLA's 48–0 win over Washington the same day eliminated Oregon State from the Rose Bowl race. Conference rules did not permit more than one team to go to a bowl game at the time, so the Civil War would be Oregon State's last game of the year. On November 18, #1 UCLA and #2 Southern California battled for the Victory Bell in the Coliseum. UCLA was 7–0–1 and Southern California was 8–1. It has been dubbed the "Game of the Century" and the "signature game" in the rivalry. The 21–20 win on O. J. Simpson's 64-yard fourth quarter scamper helped propel the Trojans to a national championship.

The final opponent on #8 Oregon State's schedule was 2–7 Oregon. They were not another giant, but they were improving. Their two victories had both come in the previous four weeks. The Beavers were coming off one of the biggest victories in their program's history and were ripe to be upset. Gary Houser's first punt was partially blocked and recovered at the Beaver 31. On their first play from scrimmage, Oregon's Eric Olsen threw a 20-yard pass. The Ducks would only gain one yard on three plays and had to settle for a 27-yard field goal. Before halftime, Oregon State's Earthquake Enyart fumbled twice inside Oregon's 10-yard line. Charlie Olds ended the Ducks' best drive of the first half by picking off an Eric Olsen pass in the Beaver red zone.

Oregon State's first drive of the second half ended on a Beaver fumble at Oregon's 43. The Ducks capitalized, quickly finding themselves with first-and-goal at the Beaver three. Oregon State's defense did not fold, stopping Oregon a foot short of the end zone on third-and-goal. However, the Ducks dove in on their fourth attempt, increasing their lead to 10–0 with five minutes left in the third quarter. Oregon State was in dire straits after fumbling again at their own 45-yard line. Oregon drove 15 yards but missed a 47-yard field goal. Early in the fourth quarter, Oregon State finally hit their stride. Starting at their own 20, the running game began finding holes over and through the Duck defense. On one third-and-eight, Steve Preece found Don Summers for a 35-yard gain. On the next play, Roger Cantlon hauled in a pass at Oregon's one-yard line. From there, Enyart plowed over the Duck defenders and into the end zone, cutting Oregon's lead to 10–7 with nine minutes left. Oregon State's defense responded by forcing Oregon to go three-and-out. The punt only carried to Oregon State's 46. It took nine plays before Oregon State had first-and-goal on the four-yard line.  The Ducks loaded up the middle to try and stop Enyart; however, Steve Preece threw them a curve, running around left end for a touchdown with two-and-a-half minutes left, taking the lead 14–10. After getting the ball back, Oregon's final four plays only netted seven yards, turning the ball over to Oregon State. The Ducks would not get it back.

The Civil War victory propelled the Beavers to #7 in the final AP Poll, which was their best ever final ranking. It would take another 33 years for Oregon State to be ranked any higher. Oregon State's 7–2–1 record was its best between 1962 and 2000. It is all the more impressive because they were only favored to win three of the ten games they played.

1968–1970
In the off-season, the Athletic Association of Western Universities was renamed the Pacific-8 conference. As good as the Giant Killers were, many expected the 1968 Beavers to be even better. Just four of the 22 starters graduated, perhaps the biggest loss was the kicker, Mike Haggard. Another starter, Jess Lewis, did not return in 1968 because he competed for the United States on the Olympic wrestling team. A top ten team returning the vast majority of their starters did not go unnoticed. Playboy rated Oregon State as the #1 team in their season preview. The pollsters rated the Beavers #6, Oregon State's highest-ever ranking up until that time.

Oregon State began the season by traveling to Iowa City, Iowa, for the third consecutive season to play Iowa. Iowa was not expected to put up much of a fight, losing the previous two to Oregon State by double digits. In the third quarter, though, Steve Preece was injured. He would not return. The backup quarterback, Gary Barton, committed three of the five Beaver turnovers. Oregon State wound up losing 21–20; a missed extra point made up the difference. Without Preece, the Beavers relied almost exclusively on Bill Enyart, who ran for 299 yards in a narrow 24–21 win over Utah, but Steve Preece returned to lead Oregon State past Washington 35–21.

The following weekend in Lexington, Kentucky, the Beavers stumbled again, losing to Kentucky 35–34. Once again, a missed extra point was the difference. After the loss, Oregon State started winning. After crushing Arizona State and doing just enough to beat Washington State, they knocked off the Jim Plunkett-led Stanford Indians 29–7 in Stanford Stadium. The win was their last in Stanford Stadium in 30 years and earned the Beavers a #15 ranking. In Tommy Prothro's first return to Corvallis, Oregon, since he was coach of the Beavers, Oregon State beat UCLA 45–21. It was the only time the Beavers would best Prothro as a coach.

The #13 Beavers traveled to the Coliseum to battle the #1 Trojans. The winner would represent the Pacific-8 in the Rose Bowl. A tie would have muddled the race. Oregon State took a 7–0 lead into the fourth quarter, but O. J. Simpson stole the show, on his way to winning the Heisman Trophy. He wound up running for 238 yards and a touchdown. Oregon State kept it close but fell 17–13.

The following weekend, the Beavers let out their frustration on the Ducks. The 41–19 win was the biggest blowout for Oregon State in the series since World War II. It also provided the Beavers their first advantage in the series (32–31–9) since they won the original Civil War in 1894. The Beavers finished #16 in the final poll. All-told, Oregon State was six points from an undefeated season. It was the closest the Beavers had come to an undefeated season since their last undefeated season in 1914 and would remain the closest until 2000. It was the third consecutive season that Oregon State finished as the runner-up in the conference to Southern California.

Despite the success, Oregon State did not receive much attention. Only the conference was allowed to go to the Rose Bowl.  No other team was allowed to participate in a bowl game.  Because they were precluded from participating in a bowl as the second-place team, most of the nation did not hear much about the team. In the off-season, Dee Andros met one of his black players, Fred Milton, on-campus.  Milton had grown a Van Dyke; however, Andros had a no facial hair policy. When Milton refused to shave it off, he was kicked off the team. The Black Student Union and 4000 other students protested Andros' decision. By the time the mess had sorted itself out, two-thirds of the black players had quit the team. There were no black recruits in the 1969 recruiting class. Andros was labeled a racist in many circles and seemed unable to shake it.

In 1969, Oregon State began the season with three straight road games. The Beavers began by losing to the Bruins and their new triple-option attack in the Coliseum. However, Oregon State managed to knock off Iowa, 42–14, and upset #18 Arizona State, 30–7. The Beavers would not beat the Sun Devils in Tempe, Arizona, again until the 2009 season. Oregon State could not build on the winning streak, losing to the #5 Trojans in Corvallis, Oregon.

Oregon State went back on the road again the following weekend against Washington. Set up by a second quarter interception, Washington drove 41 yards in eight plays to take the lead 6–0. Oregon State immediately responded by going 58 yards in seven plays to set up a Mike Nehl field goal which went through the uprights with no time left on the clock, cutting the lead to 6–3. For the next 28 minutes, the Beavers dominated every facet of the game, completely shutting the Huskies down, but Oregon State could not manage to score a single point. Getting the ball at their own 18 with 1:30 left. The Beavers managed to drive to the Husky 49. On the last play of the game, Steve Endicott lofted a pass into the night sky, which came down into the arms of Jim Scheele. Oregon State won 10–6. It was the only time the Beavers have won where all the points were scored with no time left on the clock.

Despite the win, the Beavers dropped the next two to fall to 3–4 but beat California and Washington State to go to 5–4. With less than a minute left in a Civil War knotted at seven, Mike Nehl, already having missed two field goals on the day, lined up to kick a 29-yard field. The Ducks' Jim Franklin managed to block the kick, but the ball ricocheted off of an official and hit Oregon linebacker, Don Graham's, foot beyond the line of scrimmage. Oregon State's Bill Plumeau came up with the free ball at the Oregon four.  With only time for one play, Mike Nehl kicked the game-winning 21-yard field goal through the uprights for an improbable 10–7 Beaver victory.

In 1970, Oregon State began by blowing a 9–0 halftime lead to lose 14–9 to #18 UCLA. Oregon State then beat Iowa 21–14. The following weekend, the Beavers upset #14 and undefeated Oklahoma in Norman, Oklahoma, 23–14. Steve Endicott threw three touchdown passes and the defense held the Sooners scoreless in the second half. The Beavers wound up outgaining the Sooners 450–190. The loss to Oregon State was the only non-conference home loss Oklahoma would endure in the 1970s.

After splitting with #5 Southern California and Utah, Oregon State crossed the Rockies a second time to battle #19 Houston. The Cougars were 18-point favorites but trailed the Beavers until Steven Wright hauled in a 21-yard touchdown pass with 1:17 left for a 19–16 Houston win. The loss was the first of three for Oregon State. However, the Beavers swept California, Washington State, and Oregon for the second year in a row to finish with a winning record. Oregon State would not sweep California, Oregon, and Washington State in the same season again for three decades.

1971–1975
In 1971, Oregon State started 1–2, beating Iowa in Corvallis and losing road games to Georgia and Michigan State. The Beavers then managed to beat the Bruins in the Coliseum, 34–17. This remains the last time Oregon State has defeated any team in the Coliseum. The following weekend, California's Steve Sweeney made a diving catch in the end zone with no time left on the clock for a 30–27 California victory.

After stumbling to the 2–3 start, the #11 Sun Devils came to Portland, Oregon, to play the Beavers. Arizona State had not lost in more than two years, building a 21-game winning streak. The Beavers upset the Sun Devils 24–18 behind Dave Schilling's 47 carry, 157-yard, 3 touchdown performance. In the process, Schilling became Oregon State's all-time leading rusher. The victory was Oregon State's fifth consecutive victory over Arizona State. The 1914 tie with Washington, 1933 tie with Southern California, and 1971 victory over Arizona State meant that Oregon State had ended three of the 40 longest winning streaks in college football history.  Only Notre Dame could claim the feat at the time. Miami of Florida has since joined Notre Dame and Oregon State.

After the win, Washington beat Oregon State 38–14. The following weekend, the Beavers hopped out to a 24–3 second-quarter lead over Stanford. However, the Indians clawed back to 24–17 on two Don Bunce touchdown passes. Midway through the fourth quarter Jackie Brown bowled in from one-yard out to pull Stanford within one, but Bunce's two-point conversion pass was intercepted by Steven Brown, his fourth interception of the game. However, Stanford got the ball back and scored on another Jackie Brown scamper with 53 seconds left to win 31–24. The loss was demoralizing on two fronts. Had the rest of the season played out like it did, the win over Stanford would have earned the 6–5 Beavers a Rose Bowl invitation over the 7–4 Indians.  Instead, 8–3 Stanford went to the Rose Bowl and upset #4 Michigan. In addition, the loss dropped Oregon State to 3–5. Absent a tie, the Beavers would have to win out to avoid their first losing season since 1959. However, Arizona defeated Oregon State 34–22 in Tucson, Arizona. The Beavers followed up the defeat by beating the Cougars by seven. In the Civil War, Bill Cariquist would go in from six yards out with 100 seconds left on the clock to lead the Beavers to a 30–29 victory and ensure Bobby Moore (a.k.a. Ahmad Rashad) would never see a Civil War victory. The 5–6 record would remain Oregon State's best until 1998.

Dee Andros' best season after 1971 was 1974's 3–8 mark, where the three Oregon State wins were against the other three Pacific-8 teams in the Northwest: Washington, Washington State, and Oregon. The Beavers would not replicate the feat for another three decades.  1975 began with an eight-game losing streak. The single win was a 7–0 victory over Washington State, which proved to be the last game Andros would coach at Parker Stadium. The Cougars escaped to Albany, where a Portland sportswriter ran into Washington State's beleaguered coach, Jim Sweeney. Sweeney moaned that he had just lost to the worst football team in America. The win was the last over Washington State in Corvallis in almost two decades. The season ended with a 14–7 loss to Oregon, just Andros' second loss to the Ducks and Oregon's first home win in the series since 1963. The five consecutive losing seasons matched the Beavers' longest such streak. At season's end, Andros resigned as head coach and took over as athletic director. Craig Fertig, a fund-raiser, was named the new coach of Oregon State.  He had 10 years of assistant coaching experience for the Trojans and the Portland Storm of the WFL. Oregon State was his first head coaching position.

"The Streak"
The 1971 season was the first of a slump for the Beavers that would last almost 30 years, known derisively as "The Streak." From 1971 to 1998, Oregon State failed to garner a winning record and went 65–238–6, a .210 winning percentage, the lowest winning percentage of any major college team in the era. From 1972 to 1997, between the two 5–6 seasons which book-ended The Streak, Oregon State went 55–226–6, a .192 winning percentage, again the lowest percentage of any major college team in the era. In between 1972 and 1997, only four Beaver teams reached the four-win mark. All four seasons came in between 1988 and 1994. The best season was 1988's 4–6–1 record, a .409 winning percentage.

Fertig and Avezzano years

Oregon State went 2–10 in 1976. The high point was a 10–9 win over California on a one-yard touchdown run by James Field with less than four minutes left. After starting 1–3 in 1977, #13 Brigham Young came to Corvallis, Oregon. The Cougars jumped out to a 19–0 second half lead before the Beavers came storming back. After John Norman threw a 40-yard touchdown pass to Dwayne Hall, Kent Howe and Gene Dales each returned interceptions for touchdowns en route to a 24–19 Oregon State victory, which proved to be the Beavers' last in 1977.

In 1978, Arizona and Arizona State joined the Pacific-8, becoming the Pacific-10. Both beat Oregon State by double digits.  Brigham Young also got revenge on the Beavers with a 10–7 win. In the 35 years in between 1967 and 2002, the Beavers' two best outings east of the Mississippi both happened in 1978. They tied Tennessee in front of 82,048 Volunteer fans in sold-out Neyland Stadium, 13–13, and beat Minnesota 17–14 on the east bank of the Mississippi River in Minneapolis, Minnesota. Outside of the 1978 games against Minnesota and Tennessee, Oregon State has gone 1–21 in games played east of the Mississippi since 1967.

On the first Saturday in November, Oregon State found themselves at their own three-yard line down 31–29 to Washington State in the fourth quarter. The Beavers' Steve Smith orchestrated an 87-yard drive, which was capped off by a last-second, 27-yard Kieron Walford field goal to win 32–31. The game would be the last OSU win in Pullman, Washington for over two decades. On Veteran's Day, #9 UCLA came to Corvallis, Oregon, as 15-point favorites. With 3:08 in the fourth quarter, Walford's 36-yard field goal split the uprights for a 15–13 Beaver win. The Beaver defense did not allow a completed pass in the second half and only allowed two first downs in the final two quarters. It was Oregon State's first victory over UCLA in seven years. The win was the Beavers' third of the year, but they would lose the next two to finish 3–7–1. The win over #9 UCLA would be the Beavers' last win over a top 10 team in more than two decades, until defeating the eighth-ranked Southern California Trojans in September 2000. Over the next 44 games, Oregon State would go 2–41–1 on the field, a .057 winning percentage. The 3–7–1 record would be the Beavers' best for a decade.

During one three-game stretch in 1979, Oregon State lost 131–0 to Arizona State, California, and Washington. After a 24–14 home loss to San Jose State, which stretched the losing streak to nine games, Craig Fertig was told he would not return as head coach for the 1980 campaign. The following weekend, Oregon State met Stanford in Corvallis. Stanford was tied atop the conference. Oregon State gave their all one last time for their outgoing coach. Jeff Southern scored from one yard out with 1:13 left to pull the Beavers within two. Oregon State knotted the score at 31 when Scott Richardson hit Tony Robinson for a two-point conversion. The Beavers kicked off, and Stanford's Rick Gervais fielded the ball at his two-yard line.  Not realizing where he was, he downed the ball in the end zone for a safety. The 33–31 lead held up, but the Beavers lost the final three games of the season.

To fill the vacant head coaching position, Oregon State hired the offensive coordinator at Tennessee, Joe Avezzano. However, the coaching change did little to change the Beavers' fortunes. Oregon State went on probation in 1980 for using an ineligible player in 1979. Oregon State went winless in 1980, the worst season in school history. The closest game was a ten-point loss to Long Beach State in Corvallis. Moreover, Oregon State's schedule did not include the Rose Bowl champion Trojans. The highlight of the season was a trip to the Mirage Bowl in Tokyo Japan. 86,000 watched #14 UCLA slaughter Oregon State 34–3. In the 17 years teams traveled across the Pacific to play in the Mirage Bowl (renamed the Coca-Cola Classic in 1986), the 31-point loss was the worst any team was blown out.

At the beginning of the 1981 season, Oregon State was mired in a 14-game losing streak. In the previous 24 games, the winning points in the Beavers' only victory came on a kick returning error. The first team on the Beavers' schedule was the Fresno State Bulldogs, fresh off a victory over the Oregon Ducks. The Beavers stepped out onto the field as 15-point favorites. 28,000 people turned out to see what most hoped would be Oregon State's first win in two years. On the third play from scrimmage, Fresno State's Sergio Toscan threw an 81-yard touchdown pass for a 7–0 Bulldog lead. He followed it up with a five-yard touchdown pass later in the first quarter, 14–0. In the second quarter, Fresno State tacked on another touchdown on a blocked punt, 21–0.

On the Bulldogs' opening drive of the second half, Sergio Toscan threw a third touchdown pass, opening up a 28–0 lead. Oregon State responded. The Beavers' Darryl Minor scored from five yards out to cut the lead to 21. Then a poor Bulldog punt gave the Beavers a short field. Oregon State quickly scored on a 34-yard scamper by their quarterback, Ed Singler. To start the fourth quarter, the Beavers drove 53 yards, capped by a 12-yard touchdown pass from Singler to Randy Holmes. Oregon State got the ball back at their own 39 and drove 61 yards for a touchdown, with Singler's throw to Victor Simmons covering the final 18 yards. The extra point knotted the score at 28 with 5:54 left. With 4:01 left, Oregon State's Tony Fuller came up with a Toscan pass at Fresno State's 37.  The Beavers drove down to the Bulldogs' 12 before being pushed back to the 16. On third down, rather than risk another play, Oregon State kicked a 33-yard field goal. The field goal cemented a 31–28 win. With the win, Oregon State had set the record for the biggest comeback (28 points) in major college football history at that time.

The following weekend, Tim Sim hauled in an 18-yard touchdown pass from Ed Singler with 4:39 left in the game to take a 24–20 lead in front of 74,962 stunned Tiger fans in Baton Rouge. However, Oregon State's defense could not stop LSU's offense from responding with a 10-play, 80-yard drive. The Beavers lost 27–24. Oregon State would lose the nine remaining contests, the closest game a 23–0 loss to Washington State. Although Oregon State failed to capitalize on the momentum of the Fresno State victory, they staved off what might have been a 29-game losing streak, as the one win was sandwiched between two 14-game losing streaks. The win would remain the greatest comeback in college football history for a little more than three years. In 1984, Washington State came back from a 28-point deficit against Stanford. Later in 1984, the Maryland Terrapins overcame a 31-point deficit against the Miami Hurricanes.

In 1982, Oregon State started 0–4, stretching the losing streak to 14. In Pullman, Washington, the Beavers managed to tie the Cougars 14–14 by kicking a field goal with 31 seconds left. Five games later, Oregon State finally won a game, 30–10 over 1-AA Montana in Corvallis, Oregon, after a bye week. It was the Beavers' first win in 20 tries and first ever game against a 1-AA team. Oregon State would drop the Civil War 7–6 to Oregon to finish 1–9–1. The Ducks' eight consecutive victories over the Beavers remains an Oregon record.

In 1983, Oregon State started 1–6, beating Division II Portland State 51–14 in Portland, Oregon. The win was the Beavers' first road victory since their win over the Cougars 32–31 in 1978, but it came at the cost of a season-ending injury to quarterback Ricky Greene. On October 29, they met 1–6 Stanford in Corvallis, Oregon. The Beavers won 31–18. It was their first victory over a Pac-10 opponent in four years and two days. Oregon State would lose the next two games by double digits. The 2–8 Beavers then made their way south to Eugene, Oregon, to battle the 4–6 Ducks. The Beavers and Ducks had two combined winning seasons in the previous 13, both by the Ducks. Although 1983 versions of both teams were not the best, the match-up pitted the best teams, by record, in the previous three years.

The 1983 Civil War was played in monsoon-like conditions. On November 19, 1983, the wind and rain contributed to the worst environmental disaster in the state's history until that time, when the Blue Magpie hit Newport's North Jetty and sank, releasing 60,000 gallons of oil. In Eugene, the Beavers and Ducks unsuccessfully attempted to play football. Oregon State dominated the first half, holding Oregon to 45 yards and one completed pass. The Ducks were unable to cross the Beavers' 49. However, Oregon State could not capitalize, turning the ball over three times in the Oregon red zone and missing 26- and 36-yard field goals.

In the second half, Oregon gained 300 yards but repaid Oregon State's first half generosity by turning the ball over three times inside the Beavers' 30 and missing field goals of 20 and 50 yards. The final play of the afternoon was perhaps the most exciting in the entire game.  Oregon's Mike Owens threw a 25-yard pass to Kwante Hampton to the Duck 33, who lateraled to Ladaria Johnson.  Oregon State's Tony Fuller was finally able to drag Johnson down at the Beaver 24. In 60 minutes, the teams combined for 16 turnovers, four missed field goals, and no points. When the gun sounded, the scoreboard read 0–0. With the advent of overtime in Division I-A college football in 1996, it will likely remain the last scoreless tie in college football history. The game has come to be known as "The Toilet Bowl".

The 1984 season started out a world away in front of 88,072 Buckeye fans in sold out Ohio Stadium against #6 Ohio State. Oregon State marched in 24-point underdogs. Surprisingly, the Beavers hopped out to a 14–3 halftime lead before giving up three second-half touchdowns in a 22–14 loss. Ohio State wound up winning the Big Ten and went to the Rose Bowl. From there, Oregon State could only manage home wins over Wyoming and California. Joe Avezzano was fired at the end of the 1984 season. To fill Avezzano's vacated position, Athletic Director Dee Andros wanted to hire Idaho's Dennis Erickson. In 1984, the Vandals had beaten the Beavers 41–22 in Moscow, Idaho. However, Andros was fired that winter. Instead, Oregon State hired Dave Kragthorpe. Kragthorpe had shown flashes of brilliance in his four years as head coach, winning a 1-AA national championship at Idaho State in 1981; however, he had not coached in a couple of years, having spent the previous two seasons as Utah State's Athletic Director. He brought the "air express" offense with him, which he had honed as the offensive coordinator at Brigham Young.

Kragthorpe and Pettibone years
The 1985 season started well with a win over Dennis Erickson's Idaho. The following weekend, in Portland, Oregon, Oregon State's Jim Nielsen kicked a late 20-yard field goal to beat California, 23–20. The 2–0 start was the Beavers' best since the 1967 Giant Killers season. The win over California also was the last Oregon State victory in Portland, Oregon. Despite the quick start, the season quickly began to disintegrate. Oregon State lost to Fresno State 33–24. The Bulldogs would finish the season as the only undefeated team in Division I-A and ranked #16. Over the next three weekends, Oregon State would lose to Division II Grambling, Southern California, and Washington State by a combined 124–6. The Southern California and Washington State losses were by a combined 97–0. No Beaver team had ever been beaten by 97 points in two consecutive games.

As bad as things were, they looked to get worse. Oregon State's next opponent was conference-leading Washington in Seattle. The Huskies had finished 1984 as the #2 team in the nation behind #1 BYU, having defeated previous #2 Oklahoma 28–17 in the Orange Bowl.  Oregon State also was not at full strength. All-Pac-10 receiver Reggie Bynum and starting quarterback Eric Wilhelm were both unable to play due to injuries. In Eric Wilhelm's place, freshman Rich Gonzales started. He had taken only nine snaps with the first team all year. Las Vegas odds-makers made Washington 38-point favorites. In the days leading up to the game, Steve Rudman of the Seattle Post-Intelligencer compared Oregon State to Barney Fife and called the Beavers a "blight" and an "embarrassment". The Seattle media had called a Husky victory a sure thing. David Whitley of the Orlando Sentinel said that the game pitted "David versus Goliath if David had two broken legs and had chickenpox."

Washington struck first on a 28-yard field goal. Oregon State and Gonzales responded by scoring on a 43-yard strike to Darvin Malone for a 7–3 lead. The Huskies immediately responded going 80 yards in 15 plays. Washington would threaten in the second quarter, first-and-goal at Oregon State's eight. They were pushed back to the ten before the Beavers' Reggie Hawkins was able to intercept a Husky pass in the end zone. Taking over at their 20, Oregon State drove 60 yards on seven completions. Gonzales scampered the final 20 yards himself to propel the Beavers to a 14–10 halftime lead.

In the third quarter, Washington scored a touchdown to take a 17–14 lead. With 1:32 left in the quarter, the Huskies had the ball first-and-goal at the Beaver one. Washington tried twice to break into the end zone, but they failed both times. On their third try, Osia Lewis made one of his 21 tackles, knocking the ball loose. The Beavers' Lavance Northington recovered. Washington hit a 43-yard field goal to stretch the lead to 20–14 with 7:59 left in the game. The Beavers drove down to the Husky 11 but turned the ball over on downs with 3:22 left. Washington pushed the ball to its own 30 but was forced to punt with 1:29 left. The Beavers' Andre Todd broke through the Husky line untouched and managed to block the punt, which bounded into the end zone. If not for a queer bounce, it likely would have squirted out of bounds for a safety, but Northington pounced on it for a touchdown, knotting the score at 20.  Jim Nielsen's extra point gave Oregon State a 21–20 lead. On the last play of the game, Oregon State intercepted a Washington pass at the Beaver 37. Oregon State was the first team to upset a 38-point favorite, the greatest Las Vegas line upset in history at the time.  It was the Beavers' first road win over a Pac-10 opponent since their 32–31 win over the Cougars in 1978. Osia Lewis' 21 tackles were the second most in Oregon State history. His four tackles for loss set an Oregon State record. Dave Kragthorpe waited in an empty room for his post-game interview, but the Seattle media never showed up.

The Washington game was Oregon State's last win in 1985, but the three wins were the Beavers' most in seven years. Washington would go on to split their last four games. Had they beaten Oregon State, the split would have been entitled them to play 10–1 Iowa in the Rose Bowl. Instead, they played 7–4 Colorado in the Freedom Bowl.

In 1986, Oregon State went 3–8 but managed an upset win in Provo, Utah over Brigham Young. In 1987, the Beavers started by losing to Georgia in Athens, Georgia, 41–7. The following weekend, against San Jose State, Troy Bussanich split the uprights with a 27-yard field goal with 21 seconds left to win 36–34. The win snapped the Spartans' 11-game winning streak, the nation's longest. However, the Beavers could only manage one more win in 1987, over Akron.

In 1988, Oregon State lost to Arizona, running their Pac-10 losing streak to 11, but beat San Jose State. In game three, they put their three-game winning streak against California on the line. California had a 16–3 lead entering the fourth quarter.  Still leading 16–6 with just over 10 minutes left, the clock malfunctioned, adding an extra minute of playing time.  The malfunction was not noticed at the time by the officials or seemingly anyone else. With 1:53 left, Erik Wilhelm found Brian Taylor for a three-yard touchdown, making the score 16–12. Erik Wilhelm found Brian Swanson for a two-point conversion to cut the lead to 16–14. Troy Bussanich's 23-yard field goal split the uprights with 16 seconds left, 44 seconds after the game should have ended. The win snapped Oregon State's 11-game Pac-10 losing streak. It was only after the game that the clock malfunction was noticed. The game is known alternatively as "Beaver in the Sky" and the "61-Minute Game".

Oregon State split in games with Colorado and Fresno State, but the 3–2 start was their best since 1970, their last winning season.  After a loss to Troy Aikman and the #2 UCLA Bruins, they managed to tie Stanford 20–20 on a field goal on the last play of the game.  It was the Beavers best showing in Stanford Stadium between 1968 and 1998. However, the Beavers dropped three straight heading into the Civil War. The Ducks led 10–7 heading into the fourth quarter, but gave up two Pat Chaffey touchdowns in the final period.  Oregon got no closer than Oregon State's 36-yard line in the second half. The win was the Beavers' first in the series since 1974.  Erik Wilhelm's performance helped him pass John Elway as all-time leading Pac-10 passer. However, thanks in part to five Duck sacks, he finished eight yards short of John Elway in total yardage. The 4–6–1 record was Oregon State's best season during the years 1971 to 1998.

In 1989, Oregon State beat Stanford 20–16 in Corvallis, Oregon. Then, the Beavers went on the road for four consecutive Saturdays.  They went 1–3 on the road trip, beating 1-AA Boise State 37–30. The Beavers capped off a 93-yard drive by scoring on a 10-yard touchdown pass from Nick Schichtle to Jason Kent with 1:19 left. Back in Corvallis, they tied Arizona State. A week later, looking to avoid a tie, the Beavers went for two against the Bruins after Pat Chaffey's second touchdown pulled Oregon State to within 17–16.  Reggie Pitchford hauled in Matt Booher's pass for two points and the lead, 18–17.  It was Oregon State's first win over the Bruins since 1978. The following weekend in Berkeley, California, the Beavers pushed their unbeaten streak to three, their longest since 1970. However, Oregon State lost the following three games.

In the season finale in Hawaii, the Rainbow Warriors, favored by two touchdowns, needed to beat the Beavers in order to clinch their first ever bowl invitation. Hawaii hopped out to a 23–7 fourth-quarter lead thanks in part to three Jason Elam field goals. Oregon State stormed back on two Schichtle touchdown passes to pull within two. With 4:39 left, Oregon State's Pat Chaffey was tackled inches from the goal line. The ball squirted out after he was down and recovered in the end zone by Hawaii. The officials gave Hawaii the ball at their own 20, and the Rainbow Warriors held on to win 23–21. The loss robbed Oregon State of its best season since 1970 and clinched a bowl invitation for Hawaii. The 3–4–1 conference record was the Beavers' best since 1971, and Kragthorpe earned Pac-10 coach of the year honors.

In 1990, Oregon State started poorly, losing their first five games, including their first ever loss to 1-AA Montana. In game six, Oregon State beat #21 Arizona 35–21. Arizona entered the game as 21½ point favorites. It was the Beavers' first win over a ranked team since 1978 and their first win over Arizona since 1966. According to David Rothman, this was the greatest upset in all of college football between 1985 and 1998. The probability of Oregon State winning was 7.4%. Oregon State had nothing left in the tank afterward to pull off another monumental upset and lost their next five games.  Two days after losing the Civil War 6–3, Dave Kragthorpe resigned as head coach.

To fill the empty position, Oregon State hired Northern Illinois' head coach, Jerry Pettibone. Pettibone ran a triple-option style offense, very different from Dave Kragthorpe's "air express". The Beavers' five-game losing streak in 1990 quickly mushroomed into a 15-game losing streak, Oregon State's longest ever. In the 1991 Civil War, the Ducks were favored by 19½ points, but the Beavers beat the Ducks 14–3 to snap the nation's longest losing streak.  Chad Paulson became the first OSU running back to rush for more than 100 yards in a game in two years. He also threw the only touchdown pass for either team with 10:32 left in the game, finding Maurice Wilson all alone in the end zone. The win was Oregon State's first in Eugene since 1973 and staved off a second 11-loss season.

In 1992, Oregon State dropped the opener against Kansas, but defeated Trent Dilfer's Fresno State Bulldogs 46–36. The 46 points were the most the Beavers had scored against Division 1 opposition since 1976. The following weekend, Mark Olford ran for a 4-yard touchdown and a two-point conversion with 1:47 left, erasing Arizona's 14–6 lead. The 14–14 tie was the last tie in Oregon State's history. After the 1–1–1 start, the Beavers lost the next eight to finish 1–9–1.

Oregon State's 1993 season started in Laramie, Wyoming. The Beavers rallied in the fourth quarter to beat the Cowboys 27–16. The win was the easternmost for OSU between 1978 and 2002. After losing three straight, Oregon State defeated Arizona State, for the first time since 1971, and Pacific. The Beavers lost by 25 points in the Coliseum against the Trojans. They also lost the following three games by three points against #19 UCLA, on their way to a Pac-10 championship; by four points at Stanford; and by seven points against Washington.

In the Civil War, the Beavers were 10-point underdogs and trailed 12–7 with less than seven minutes left, but J.J. Young managed to tackle Ducks' punter Tommy Thompson at the Oregon 24. It took six plays to score with J.J. Young providing 20 yards on five carries, including the final two-yard plunge with 3:50 left. Rahim Muhammad ran in for the two-point conversion, which capped the day's scoring. The final score was Oregon State 15 - Oregon 12.  In four years (1990–1993), the Beavers defense had limited the Ducks to two touchdowns. The Beavers finished second in the nation in rushing at 297.7 yards per game. They also only averaged 2.7 completions per game. In the offseason, Pettibone successfully recruited a blue chip option quarterback, Tim Alexander, who chose Oregon State over Nebraska and Oklahoma.

In the first four Beaver games of 1994, the home team won every game. Unfortunately for Oregon State, three of their first four games were on the road. They lost to Arizona State by six and beat Wyoming before losing to Fresno State and #6 Arizona. Against the Trojans in Corvallis, Oregon State hopped out to a 13–0 lead.  Southern California responded by scoring 27 consecutive points to post a 27–13 lead. Starting quarterback Don Shanklin was injured and replaced by Tim Alexander. Alexander led the Beavers back to within 27–19. With less than eight minutes left at the Trojan 45, he took off on a 31-yard scamper but suffered a broken collar bone when he was tackled. He would not play another down in 1994. Three plays later, third-string quarterback Rahim Muhammad fumbled at the Trojan seven. It was the seventh Beaver fumble and the only one that would be recovered by the Trojans. Oregon State got the ball back and drove into Trojan territory, but Rahim Muhammad was sacked at the Trojan 44 to end the game.

On the Ides of October in the Rose Bowl, the Beavers finally won in Pasadena, California, beating UCLA, the defending Pac-10 champions, 23–14. Don Shanklin and J.J. Young each ran for more than 150 yards, piling up 428 rushing yards; Shanklin was 0–4 passing. The win was the first conference win for Oregon State outside of Oregon in five years. After the win, the Beavers lost to Stanford and Washington but rallied to beat Pacific 24–12, becoming the last Division I-A team to throw a touchdown pass in 1994 in the process. They followed up the victory with a 21–3 win over #24 Washington State, eliminating the Cougars from Rose Bowl contention.

The Civil War offered the Beavers the chance for their first five-win season in 23 years and simultaneously eliminate another team from Rose Bowl contention, the #12 Ducks. Oregon only needed a win to travel to their first Rose Bowl in 37 years. After spotting the Ducks a 10–0 lead, the Beavers' Chris Cross recovered a blocked punt for a touchdown to cut the Ducks' lead to 10–6 at halftime.  Nine minutes into the third quarter, Don Shanklin sneaked into the end zone to put Oregon State up 13–10. With less than five minutes left in the game, the Beavers faced fourth-and-one at the Duck 30. Shanklin sneaked for what appeared to be a first down, but the referees spotted the ball short. The Ducks responded by driving 70 yards in 59 seconds, scoring on a 19-yard pass with 3:43 left to take a 17–13 lead. Oregon State drove 64 yards to the Oregon 14 but turned the ball over on downs, when Shanklin's pass splashed down incomplete with 34 seconds left. In the offseason, Pettibone scrapped the wishbone in favor of the flexbone in hopes of increasing passing opportunities.

Oregon State opened the 1995 season in Corvallis against 1-AA Idaho. The Beavers held on to win 14–7 but had more punts than first downs. Despite the close win, Oregon State gave Pettibone a contract extension through 1998. The following weekend, the Oregon State lost to University of the Pacific 23–10. It was Pacific's most lopsided victory in 1995, their final year with a football team.  The following weekend in Denton, Texas, Oregon State hopped out to a 27–23 fourth-quarter lead over North Texas, playing in their first home game as a Division I-A team. The Mean Green were still looking for their first win as a Division I-A team when North Texas' Jason Mills threw a 4-yard touchdown pass with nine seconds left. The win would be the Mean Green's only one over a Division I-A team in 1995. Oregon State lost the next three games to Arizona State and the Washington schools. Against California, the Beavers hopped out to a 12–6 first-half lead but gave up a touchdown with 6:40 left to lose 13–12. Oregon State proceeded to lose their final four games. The final two were particularly vexing, as the Trojans (Rose) and the Ducks (Cotton) each wrapped up New Year's Day bowl games. Also, with the win, the Ducks became the first home team to win the Civil War in six years.

Oregon State opened the 1996 season losing to 1-AA Montana 35–14 in Corvallis. In two road games against Southern California and Baylor, the Beavers lost a combined 88–27. At the end of September, Oregon State scored two fourth-quarter touchdowns in Berkeley against California to tie the game at 35. There had never been a tie in the California-Oregon State series, and this game would be no different as the game went into overtime. This was the first season that NCAA Division I-A football instituted overtime play to decide tied games. The teams traded touchdowns in the first overtime. In the second overtime, the Beavers lined up for a game-winning field goal on third down at the three. The snap was low and Randy Lund's kick was blocked. Kato Serwanga picked up the ball and nearly ended the game, rumbling 71-yards before finally being dragged down. After Lund's 49-yard field goal was short in the third overtime, California's Pat Barnes punched it in from three yards out for a 48–42 win. It was the first triple overtime Division I-A game.

Oregon State lost to Washington State 24–3 but beat Stanford 26–12 in Corvallis behind a Beaver record 11 sacks, snapping Oregon State's second 15-game losing streak. The Beavers did not build a winning streak, losing three straight to the Arizona schools and Washington. Against Northern Illinois, Pettibone beat up on his old team with Oregon State posting a 67–22 victory. The 67 points were the most points the Beavers had scored in 63 years. In the 1996 Civil War, Oregon soundly beat Oregon state 49–13. Pettibone resigned the following Monday. Oregon State hired Southern California's beleaguered offensive coordinator, Mike Riley. Riley scrapped the flexbone in favor of a pro-style offense. The most important scholarship offer in 1997 may well have been center Dustin Janz from Glendora, California. After offering Janz a scholarship, Riley invited Janz's quarterback, Jonathan Smith, to walk on. Smith accepted the offer, red-shirting in 1997.

Riley and Erickson years
Oregon State opened the 1997 season by scoring 27 fourth-quarter points to beat North Texas 33–7. The Beavers, behind seven sacks, hopped out to a 24–20 lead over #21 Stanford, only to watch the Cardinal win on a two-yard touchdown run with 27 seconds left. Against #25 Arizona State, the defending Pac-10 champions, a 10–7 halftime lead turned into another narrow loss, 13–10. Oregon State beat San Jose State and Utah State by a combined 50–28 score. With the wins, the Beavers swept their non-conference slate for the first time in 40 years. The 3–2 start was also Oregon State's best since 1988, but they would lose their remaining six games. The closest loss was 48–30 to the Ducks in the Civil War. The 30 points were the most the Beavers had scored in the Civil War since 1974.

Oregon State opened the 1998 season beating both Nevada and Baylor by a combined 75–23, the Beavers' first 2–0 start since 1985 and most lopsided 2–0 start since 1935.  In the Coliseum, against the #18 Trojans, the Beavers only trailed 23–20 with three minutes left, but Southern California scored 17 points in just over a minute to win 40–20. After losing to the Sun Devils 24–3 in Tempe, Arizona, the Beavers rebounded in Logan, Utah, against Utah State, winning 20–16. The win was Oregon State's first away from Corvallis, Oregon, since the win over UCLA in the Rose Bowl in 1994.  The following weekend, the Beavers beat the Cardinal 30–23 in Palo Alto, California. The win was the first win over a Pac-10 foe in two years. The win was the first in Stanford Stadium since 1968. It also was Oregon State's first 4–2 start in 30 years.

After losing 28–7 to #16 Arizona, the Beavers traveled to Seattle, Washington, to play the Huskies. Oregon State had won only one game against Washington since 1974. In the second quarter, the Beavers benched starting quarterback Terrance Bryant, who was playing with a lingering injury, in favor of redshirt freshman Jonathan Smith. Nevertheless, Washington hopped out to a 28–7 lead in the third quarter. However, the Beavers gnawed their way back.  After a Husky punt gave the Beavers the ball at their own 22 with 30 seconds left and down 35–28, Oregon State responded by going 78 yards in five plays. A 33-yard touchdown pass from Jonathan Smith to Tim Alexander ran out the final seconds in the game. Rather than kicking the extra point to force overtime, the Beavers went for two, but Smith's pass to Roddy Tompkins was broken up in the end zone by Washington's Nigel Burton. Jonathan Smith's 469 passing yards were both Oregon State and Husky Stadium records. The following weekend, Oregon State lost to California 20–19 in Corvallis.

Against #3 UCLA, Oregon State's Jose Cortez tied the game 34–34 with a 28-yard field goal with 31 seconds left, but his kickoff went out of bounds at the Bruin 39. UCLA wasted no time as Cade McNown found Brad Melsby for a 61-yard touchdown with 21 seconds left to win 41–34. UCLA extended the nation's longest winning streak to 18 games and, if not for a questionable fumble in its final game of the season at Miami, would have been invited to play in the first BCS national championship game. The loss to UCLA cemented Oregon State's 28th losing season, but they had lost three consecutive games by a combined nine points.

In the Civil War game in Corvallis, #15 Oregon took a 31–24 lead with 2:34 left, but Oregon State drove 71 yards in just over a minute.  The final 30 yards was a Jonathan Smith to Tim Alexander touchdown pass. The Beavers opted to tie, rather than go for two.  The game went to overtime. Oregon State scored first to take a 38–31 lead. Oregon's fourth-down pass fell incomplete, and Beaver fans stormed the field. However, a pass interference penalty was called, giving the Ducks a first down, which they ultimately converted into a touchdown. Most Beaver fans who had stormed the field did not return to their seats but instead remained crowded around the edge of the field. In the second overtime, Oregon State's defense forced an Oregon field goal. On second down at the Oregon 16, OSU's Ken Simonton rumbled around right end for a touchdown into the crowd ringing the field for a 44–41 victory. The 44 points scored were the most the Beavers had ever scored in the Civil War.

Although the Beavers had now suffered 28 consecutive losing seasons, the five wins in 1998 were the most for Oregon State in 27 years. In January 1999, Mike Riley resigned to coach the San Diego Chargers. Having just lost its head coach to the NFL, the Beavers hired a former NFL coach, Dennis Erickson, to take over the reins in Corvallis.

1999 — The long streak ends

The Dennis Erickson Era at Oregon State began in Reno, Nevada on September 4, 1999. Nevada took a 13–7 lead into the fourth quarter, but tight end Martin Maurer caught a Jonathan Smith pass and rumbled 74-yards for a 14–13 Oregon State lead. Ken Simonton would tack on two more touchdowns to give the Beavers a 28–13 win. In the offseason, Parker Stadium had been renamed Reser Stadium.  The first opponent to visit Reser Stadium was Fresno State. After spotting the Bulldogs a 14–13 first-quarter lead, the Beavers outscored Fresno 33–9. Billy Volek and the Bulldogs would go on to win the WAC championship.

Georgia Southern, the top-rated 1-AA team, and their star running back, Adrian N. Peterson, who would wind up the leading rusher in Division I-AA history, arrived in Corvallis, Oregon for a September 18 matchup. Peterson ran for 172 yards and two touchdowns. The game featured a multitude of big plays and excitement, and was tied at 34 with seven minutes left, but the Beavers scored twice in a three-minute span to put Georgia Southern away. It would be Georgia Southern's worst loss in 1999 on their way to the first of two consecutive 1-AA national championships.

Oregon State took their 3–0 record to Southern California looking for their first 4–0 start since 1957. The #16 Trojans held a 37–7 lead with 12 minutes left. After benching Jonathan Smith, back-up Terrance Bryant led Oregon State back with 22 unanswered points but could get no closer. The 22 points were the most fourth quarter points Southern California had given up in more than a quarter century. After losing to Washington, Oregon State held a 17–14 lead over Stanford with four minutes left, but lost 21–17. Stanford wound up winning the Pac-10 that season. The following weekend, in Corvallis, Oregon, Oregon State handed UCLA its worst loss since 1930, 55–7. With a win over Washington State in Pullman, Washington, Oregon State was a game away from its first non-losing season since 1970. In the Beavers first try for their sixth win, on November 6 in Corvallis, Kyle Boller put California on top in the first quarter with an 83-yard touchdown pass. The seven points would keep California in the lead into the fourth quarter. However, Oregon State exorcised 28 years worth of demons with two fourth-quarter touchdowns for a 17–7 win. The scoreboard read, "Hail Dorothy! The wicked streak is dead!"

With a win on November 13 against Arizona, ranked #4 before the season began, Oregon State would be able to clinch its first bowl berth since 1965. The Beavers took the lead on a 65-yard touchdown pass from Jonathan Smith to Roddy Tompkins with 88 seconds left in the first half. Oregon State would not relinquish it, winning 28–20. After losing the Civil War to Oregon 25–14 in Eugene, Oregon, Oregon State was invited to the 1999 O'ahu Bowl against Hawaii. Hawaii had rebounded from an 0–12 campaign in 1998 to go 8–4 in 1999, the best one-year turnaround in NCAA history at that time. Oregon State took the opening kickoff and drove 80 yards for a touchdown.  Oregon State did not score again until the last play of the first half, when Ryan Cesca kicked a 37-yard field goal to knot the game at 10. The 37-yard field goal was his only made attempt in four first half tries.  Prick Hannum's 35-yard field goal with 2:58 left gave Hawaii a 23–10 lead. Oregon State drove 81 yards in 1:31 to cut the lead to 23–17. Roddy Tompkins recovered Ryan Cesca's ensuing onside kick at Hawaii's 48. However, T.J. Houshmandzadeh was called for a controversial procedural penalty, nullifying the recovery.  A second attempt at an onside kick went out of bounds, and Hawaii ran out the clock.

2000 — Pac-10 co-champions

Oregon State started out the 2000 campaign narrowly beating Division I-AA Eastern Washington 21–19. Ken Simonton became the all-time leading Beaver rusher, running for 200 yards. The following weekend in Albuquerque, New Mexico, New Mexico hopped out to a 20–14 fourth-quarter lead, but the Beavers took a one-point lead on T.J. Houshmandzadeh's nine-yard touchdown pass from Jonathan Smith.  Up one, Oregon State faced fourth-and-one at New Mexico 43-yard line. Simonton ran for a 43-yard touchdown. The Lobos drove to the Beaver 29, but Keith Heyward-Johnson intercepted Rudy Caamano's pass with 20 seconds left to cement a 28–20 win. Following a bye, the third time was the charm, as Oregon State throttled San Diego State 35–3 in Corvallis. It was the Beavers first win over San Diego State in three tries.

The following weekend, the #7 Trojans arrived in Corvallis. Oregon State had not defeated Southern California since the Beavers' Giant Killer year in 1967. In the 33 preceding years, the Trojans had outscored the Beavers 991–268, averaging winning each game 38–10. Oregon State only lost one game by less than a touchdown and that was in 1968 (17–13). The 2000 Trojans were the highest ranked version the Beavers had faced since 1988. The team was buoyed on both sides of the ball by two future Pro Bowlers: Carson Palmer on offense and Troy Polamalu on defense. Starting tailback Sultan McCullough came in averaging 118 yards a game.

On the Trojans' first play from scrimmage, the Beavers forced Carson Palmer out of the pocket and intercepted the future Heisman winner. On the ensuing drive, Chad Johnson hauled in a 15-yard touchdown pass from Jonathan Smith. A little over four minutes later, Ken Simonton scampered in from 20 yards out to put Oregon State up 14–0 less than 10 minutes into the game. The deficit only seemed to wake the Trojans from their slumber. Palmer threw a 12-yard touchdown pass to pull within seven. After the Beavers broke into the Trojan red zone, Oregon State fumbled, and the Trojans' Zeke Moreno picked it up and ran 88 yards for a touchdown. It was Zeke Moreno's third defensive touchdown against the Beavers in his career. At that point, things looked bleak for Oregon State; a 14–0 lead had degenerated into a 14–14 tie. The Beavers had never beaten the Trojans after giving up two touchdowns.

At that point, the improbable happened, a possum appeared running around in the South end zone. It proceeded to run north down the field. As it neared the North end zone, the crowd grew louder and louder, cheering on the marsupial. When it finally crossed the goal line, the crowd exploded. The jumbotron was showing a slow motion replay of the possum's ramble, when it was finally wrangled by Jess Lewis, head of maintenance for Oregon State's athletic facilities and former Giant Killer. Thirty-three years previous, Lewis had made the game-saving tackle of O.J Simpson and recovered O. J. Simpson's fumble after Simpson's final carry of the day to seal the 1967 victory, the Beavers' last win over the Trojans. Just like that, the crowd was back in the game and whatever momentum the Trojans had evaporated. The half ended tied at 14.

The Trojans took the second half kickoff and drove into Beaver territory. They looked completely in charge when Antonie Harris hauled in what appeared to be a Carson Palmer touchdown pass. However, the play was nullified by a delay of game penalty. The Trojans had to settle for a field goal attempt which hit an upright to preserve the tie.  Defenses dominated the third quarter. McCullough left the game with a knee injury. The Beavers had held him to 33 yards, 85 yards short of his season average. Early in the fourth quarter, the Trojans blinked. Petros Papadakis fumbled inside the Trojan 10-yard line. Oregon State's Calvin Carlyle came up with the ball.  Simonton plowed in from two yards out to take a 21–14 lead with 11:14 left. After the Trojans punted, Oregon State drove to the Trojan 24. Ryan Cesca connected on his first goal of the year to take a 24–14 lead. After two consecutive Trojan drives ended in interceptions, the game appeared over, but Oregon State's punter, Mike Fessler, fumbled at the Beavers' 12-yard line. Palmer threw his second touchdown pass with 2:16 left, narrowing the deficit to 24–21.  The Trojans' failed onside kick gave Oregon State great field position. Simonton turned a short gain into a 36-yard touchdown, which put the game away. The touchdown gave Simonton 234 yards on the day, the second most yards the Trojans had ever given up to one running back. The Trojans could only manage 63 yards rushing; they were outrushed by the possum. The famous run by the possum entered the lore of Oregon State football, and Oregon State was still unbeaten at 4–0.

The following weekend, #23 Oregon State traveled to Seattle, Washington, to battle #11 Washington. Washington had already beaten the #4 Miami Hurricanes 34–29 in Seattle, Washington. Miami would wind up the #2 team in the country in 2000, and the Huskies would finish #3 nationally. The Beavers were ranked for the first time since the end of the 1968 season. Down 33–23 with less than eight minutes left, Jonathan Smith engineered an improbable comeback, throwing an 80-yard touchdown pass to Chad Johnson wearing just one shoe.  The Beavers got the ball back with less than five minutes left and drove 60 yards to the Husky 25. Trailing 33–30, the Beavers faced second and one with 42 seconds left and no timeouts. Instead of throwing a pass, Smith handed off to Simonton, who was tackled for a loss by Washington's Larry Tripplett. The Beavers had failed to call a third-down play beforehand, so Jonathan Smith was forced to spike the ball with less than 20 seconds left. Now facing fourth down, Ryan Cesca came on to kick a 46-yard field goal but missed wide right with 14 seconds left. The Beavers had suffered their first loss of the season.

The following weekend, the defending Pac-10 champion Cardinal came to Corvallis. Earlier in the year, Stanford had defeated #5 Texas 27–24. The Cardinal hopped out to a 3–0 first quarter, but the Beavers led at halftime 17–6. Early in the third quarter, in the shadow of their own goalpost, Jonathan Smith hit Chad Johnson on a short sideline route. Johnson eluded his defender and went the distance for a 97-yard touchdown play, the longest pass in Beaver history. Stanford never challenged after that point, losing 38–6.  It was the biggest loss for the Cardinal in 2000.

The next Saturday, Oregon State traveled to the Rose Bowl to play #23 UCLA. The Bruins started off the 2000 season beating #3 Alabama and #3 Michigan. UCLA led at halftime 10–7. In the first half, Oregon State's starting running back, Ken Simonton, reaggravated a nagging groin injury and could not return to the game. The second half would prove to be an epic battle. Just 52 seconds into the third quarter, Jonathan Smith threw his first interception since the Eastern Washington game. Mat Ball returned the interception for a touchdown and a 17–7 lead. The Beavers responded less than two minutes later with their version of the Immaculate Reception.  Smith threw to tight end Martin Maurer over the middle, but UCLA's Marques Anderson knocked the ball out of Maurer's hands. The ball fluttered through the air and wound up in the arms of Oregon State receiver Robert Prescott, who ran in for a 57-yard touchdown pass.  The Bruins took a 31–21 fourth-quarter lead, but the Beavers swiftly tied the game at 31 with 9:25 left on a four-yard touchdown pass from Smith to Maurer. Oregon State built a 37–31 lead but faced 3rd-and-long inside its own ten-yard line. Disaster struck; Smith fumbled in the end zone and UCLA recovered. However, a penalty flag was on the field.  Maurer was called for a touchdown-saving false start, nullifying the play. On 3rd-and-21, Antonio Battle ran for 22 yards on a draw play. Later in the drive, Patrick McCall ran for a 66-yard touchdown with 1:52 left. The Bruins scored to pull within six, 44–38, and recovered the onside kick, but turned the ball over on downs to effectively end the game.

After beating Washington State 38–9 on October 28, the 7–1 Beavers traveled to Berkeley, California, to play the Golden Bears. The Beavers were ranked #11 in the BCS standings, their first ever BCS ranking. They were ranked #10 in the Associated Press poll, breaking into the national top ten rankings for the first time since 1968. The Beaver-Golden Bear game was one of streaks. In the first seven minutes, the Beavers built a 14–0 lead on two Ken Simonton runs. The Golden Bears narrowed the lead to 14–12 early in the second quarter. Oregon State scored 17 points in a six-and-a-half minute span to take a 31–12 lead with 2:53 left. Kyle Boller threw his second touchdown pass with 10 seconds left in the first half to pull within 31–19. A little over 20 minutes into the second half, Kyle Boller's third touchdown pass cut the Beaver lead to 31–29 with 9:43 left. Oregon State's Patrick McCall scored on a 27-yard run with 6:06 left to take a 38–29 lead. The Golden Bears kicked a 40-yard field goal with 1:44 left, which made the final score 38–32.

The following weekend, Oregon State went to Tucson, Arizona, to play Arizona. The Beavers had never beaten the Wildcats in Tucson.  Oregon State won 33–9. It was the first time the Wildcats had been held without a touchdown since 1994, when Oregon beat them 10–9 on their way to the Rose Bowl. The win set up the biggest Civil War game in generations. Fifth-ranked Oregon came to Corvallis to play #8 Oregon State, each with identical 9–1 records. Oregon, with a win, would clinch the Pac-10 championship and a Rose Bowl appearance. Oregon State was a win away from a share of the Pac-10 championship but needed help to go to the Rose Bowl. Washington's win over the Beavers had been the first of six consecutive second half comebacks by the Huskies on their way to a 9–1 record of their own. Oregon State needed a win and a Washington loss to go to the Rose Bowl. The game featured the highest ranked Beaver and Duck teams ever.  Oregon and Oregon State's combined 18–2 record was the best combined record since 1933, when the Beavers and Ducks were 12–0–2 entering that year's Civil War game.

On Oregon's opening drive, Joey Harrington was intercepted by Jake Cookus, who returned the ball 13 yards to Oregon's 18. From there, Jonathan Smith found Robert Prescott for a 31-yard touchdown pass less than five minutes into the game. Six minutes later, Smith threw a 49-yard touchdown pass to Prescott to put the Beavers up 14–0. After Oregon's Josh Frankel missed a 44-yard field goal, Oregon State drove 58 yards to set up a 32-yard Ryan Cesca field goal. Harrington cut the lead to 17–7 after he snuck in from six yards out. In the third quarter, Simonton scampered in from 20 yards out to put the Beavers up 23–7. In the fourth quarter, Oregon's Sammy Morris scored from one yard out to cut the lead to 23–13, which proved to be the final score. Midway through the final quarter, the Ducks' last real threat ended when Sefa O'Reilly sacked Harrington, forcing a fumble, which the Beavers recovered. Oregon State's defense wound up forcing six Harrington turnovers. The 23 points were the fewest Oregon State had scored since the Eastern Washington game. For the first time since their loss to Oregon on September 30, Washington would fail to overcome a second half deficit; they did not need to, easily beating Washington State 51–3 to clinch a Rose Bowl berth. Three teams from the Pacific Northwest finished 1–2–3 for the first time since 1941, all with 7–1 conference records.

As the United States waited to see who won the disputed 2000 presidential election, Oregon State waited to see where they would play their bowl game. Fifteen days later, on December 4, one of the two mysteries was solved when the #5-ranked Beavers were invited to play the #10 Notre Dame Fighting Irish in the Fiesta Bowl in Tempe, Arizona on January 1, 2001. Oregon State had not won in Tempe since 1969. Notre Dame had last won in Tempe in 1998, the last time they had played there. Notre Dame began the season against four consecutive ranked opponents: #25 Texas A&M, #1 Nebraska, #13 Purdue, and #23 Michigan State. Notre Dame split the four games.  They beat Texas A&M 24–10, but lost to Nebraska in overtime after future Heisman Trophy winner Eric Crouch crashed in from seven yards out. To add injury to insult, Notre Dame's starting quarterback, Arnaz Battle, was injured in the loss. The following week, the Irish beat Drew Brees and the Boilermakers 23–21 on a last second field goal but lost to T.J. Duckett and the Michigan State Spartans 27–21 on a 68-yard touchdown pass from Jeff Smoker to Herb Haygood with 1:48 left. Michigan State was the last ranked team Notre Dame would play. After making Matt LoVecchio the starting quarterback, the Irish swept their final seven opponents. Only 8–3 Air Force managed to stay within 12 points of the Irish. Arnaz Battle was converted into a flanker. The real star of the Irish was running back Julius Jones with 1169 all-purpose yards. In their 11 games, Notre Dame only turned the ball over eight times.  LoVecchio was only intercepted once.

Oregon State had not won a bowl game in 38 seasons. Notre Dame won four national championships in that span. Despite the teams' histories, Oregon State was a three-point favorite at kickoff. In the first quarter, Oregon State outgained Notre Dame 110–8 but clung to a 3–0 lead on a Ryan Cesca's 32-yard field goal midway through the quarter. Five seconds into the second quarter, Cesca doubled the lead with a 29-yard field goal. On the Beavers' next drive, the Irish stopped the Beavers on fourth-and-goal at the Irish 1, but were forced to punt. Oregon State got the ball back at their own 26. Chad Johnson took a short Jonathan Smith pass and turned it into a 74-yard touchdown with 4:18 left in the half. The play proved to be the most controversial in the game, as replays showed the referees had clearly missed Johnson dropping the ball at the two-yard line before he scored the touchdown. After getting the ball back, LoVecchio was sacked twice to push Notre Dame back to their own two-yard line. Oregon State's Calvin Carlyle bailed out the Irish with a personal foul that gave Notre Dame a first down. Aided by a phantom pass interference call, the Irish drove to the Beaver 12-yard line, where Nick Setta kicked a 29-yard field goal to cut the lead to 12–3 at halftime. Oregon State had outgained Notre Dame 278–98 at halftime but only led by nine points.

In the second half, Notre Dame finally forced Oregon State to punt. However, LoVecchio fumbled after being sacked by Darnell Robinson, and Oregon State's Eric Manning recovered the fumble at the Irish 26. Two plays later, Smith threw a 23-yard touchdown to T.J. Houshmandzadeh with 12:04 left in the third quarter. The touchdown was Smith's 19th touchdown pass, an Oregon State record.  Less than three minutes later, Notre Dame was forced to punt on its next possession. Houshmandzadeh returned the ball 16 yards and fumbled after a Rocky Boiman hit. Oregon State's Terrell Roberts picked up the fumble and ran 45-yards for a touchdown. Robert Prescott hauled in the two-point conversion for a 27–3 Oregon State lead. On Notre Dame's next drive, Robinson intercepted LoVecchio, giving the ball to Oregon State at the Irish 22.  Four plays later, Johnson hauled in his second touchdown from four yards out with 7:02 left. Simonton capped Oregon State's scoring by rumbling in from four yards out with 4:54 left in the third quarter to put the Beavers up 41–3. In 7:10, Oregon State had scored 29 points, more than any other team on Notre Dame's schedule could muster in 60 minutes. Shortly thereafter, the Beavers began to substitute heavily. Notre Dame took advantage, when Tony Fisher ran in from one yard out to cut the lead to 32. 41–9 proved to be the final score.

Oregon State outgained Notre Dame 446–155. Julius Jones was held to 30 yards rushing. The rest of the Irish combined to rush for -13 yards on 24 carries. LoVecchio was 13 of 33 for 138 yards with two interceptions; he also carried the ball nine times for -49 yards, netting 89 total yards. The win was all the more impressive when one considers that Oregon State was penalized a Fiesta Bowl and school record 18 times for 174 yards. Ken Simonton's 85 yards gave him 1559 yards for the year, a new Oregon State record. A crowd of 75,428 turned out to watch the game, the best-ever attended non-championship game Fiesta Bowl and the most-attended Beaver victory ever. Estimates of the number of Beaver fans in the stadium that night ranged from 30,000 to 40,000. The loss was the biggest for Notre Dame in more than 15 years. It was the second-largest postseason loss for the Irish in their history. Only 1973's 40–6 Orange Bowl loss was larger. The win was Oregon State's largest margin of victory in a postseason game since the 1940 Pineapple Bowl.  Oregon State finished 11–1, their best record in 93 years. The Beavers finished ranked #4 nationally, their highest ever ranking.

2001 — unfulfilled expectations

Oregon State's 2001 recruiting class included two future Pro Bowlers: Derek Anderson and Steven Jackson. Just over six months later, Ken Simonton appeared on the cover of Sports Illustrated's College Preview issue. The issue ranked Oregon State #1. The first game was on the first Sunday in September in Fresno, California, against the Fresno State Bulldogs. Fresno State was riding high after upsetting Colorado in Boulder 24–22. The Bulldogs hopped out to a 17–3 second-quarter lead. After forcing a punt with just over six minutes left, the Bulldogs' Kendall Edwards hit the Beavers' Terrell Roberts, breaking Roberts' hand, before Roberts could field the punt. At the time, the punting team members were required by rule to stay more than two yards away from the returner until he fielded the punt. Edwards arrived so early that the ball hit him in the back. After getting up, Edwards hit Patrick McCall, who fielded the punt. Edwards then proceeded to taunt McCall before being swarmed by teammates, congratulating him for his "accomplishment." Roberts did not return to the game and missed the following game after undergoing surgery for his broken hand.  The play resulted in a 15-yard penalty against Fresno State but no ejection for the blatant and dangerous infraction and subsequent taunting. The Beavers responded by driving 57 yards, Simonton's 16-yard touchdown scamper capped the first half scoring at 17–10.  Oregon State could get no closer than seven the rest of the game, losing 44–24. At game's end, the Beavers were penalized 19 times for 129 yards; outside of the personal foul, the Bulldogs were penalized eight times for 58 yards. Fresno State fans continue to celebrate Edwards' hit. On top of everything else, Oregon State fans complained of poor treatment by the Fresno fans, including reports of being pelted with batteries.

Oregon State beat New Mexico State 27–22 in a game which was not as close as the final score indicated. The Aggies scored their final touchdown with 1:33 left. The scheduled September 15 game against Montana State was canceled due to the terrorist attacks of September 11, 2001. To this day Oregon State has never played Montana State in football. After three weeks off, #10 UCLA made the trek to Corvallis and crushed Oregon State 38–7. The lone Beaver touchdown was a 63-yard run by freshman, Steven Jackson, his first college touchdown. The Bruins would climb to #3 in the BCS before losing four of its final five games. Terrell Roberts returned in a reserve role for the Bruins game, but free safety Calvin Carlyle received a season-ending injury in practice leading up to the game.

In Pullman, Washington, against the Cougars on October 6, undefeated Washington State hopped out to a 31–3 halftime lead. Entering the fourth quarter, Oregon State had pulled within 21. With less than seven minutes left, Kenny Farley blocked a Cougar punt. Jason Lowe picked up the ball and ran in from four yards out for a touchdown to cut the Cougars lead to 34–20.  With 35 seconds left, Mitch Meeuwsen, playing in only his second game, returned a Cougar fumble 35 yards for a touchdown to pull the Beavers within seven.  However, Ryan Cesca's onside kick was recovered by the Cougars, who held on for the 34–27 win.

After the narrow loss, Oregon State went 2–1 against the Arizonas and California. Then, the Beavers traveled to the Coliseum to play the Trojans. Oregon State's last victory over the Trojans in the Coliseum was in 1960. Troy Polamalu put the Trojans on the board first by blocking a Beaver punt, which the Trojans recovered in the Beaver end zone, in the first quarter to put the Trojans up 7–0.  Both teams' defenses dominated for most of the game. Oregon State could only manage a 24-yard Ryan Cesca field goal in the first half.

In the third quarter, after the Trojans took a 10–3 lead, Steven Jackson hauled in a four-yard touchdown pass from Jonathan Smith to knot the score at 10. In the fourth quarter, the Beavers, trying to exorcise 41 years worth of demons at the Coliseum, drove into the Trojan red zone twice only to have both drives end with 35-yard field goal attempts. Ryan Cesca missed the first wide left with 6:17 left and the second wide right with 33 seconds left. In overtime, the Trojans won the toss and elected to go second. Cesca hit a 29-yard field goal on the Beavers' possession. Carson Palmer, who the Beavers had held in check all game, finally got the Trojan offense into the end zone, when he broke Terrell Roberts' tackle and dove in from four yards out, absorbing a Nick Barnett hit at the goal line. The 16–13 Southern California victory remains the closest Trojan victory over the Beavers in the last half century. The loss dropped Oregon State to 3–5.

In order to avoid a losing season, Oregon State would have to sweep their final three games. The task looked difficult with #8 Washington and #4 Oregon, tied atop the conference, remaining on the schedule. The Beavers had not beaten the Huskies since Lavance Northington recovered a blocked punt in the end zone in 1985. Aside from the 1985 upset, Oregon State had not beaten Washington since 1974, which was the last Beaver victory over the Huskies in Corvallis. Since the victory in 1974, Washington had outscored Oregon State 807–305, averaging beating the Beavers by more than three touchdowns every time the two took the field. The 2001 Husky team started off the season by besting #10 Michigan and had only tasted defeat once, against #7 UCLA in the first half of the season.  Both Steven Jackson and Ken Simonton scored three touchdowns as the Beavers blew out the Huskies 49–24. Simonton caught the only touchdown reception of his four-year career. It was the largest margin of victory for Oregon State over Washington in a half century.  The following weekend, Oregon State crushed Northern Arizona 45–10, evening the Beavers record at 5–5. Simonton rushed for 151 yards, leaving him at 887 yards on the year. With 113 yards against Oregon, he would be the first running back in the Pac-10 and fifth running back in college football history to rush for 1,000 yards in four different years.

Two weeks later, the Beavers and #4 Ducks squared off in the first December Civil War in more than a half century. The teams had to compete with rain, hail, and wind gusting up to 30 mph. The conditions only got worse as the game progressed. Oregon had beaten #22 Wisconsin to start the year but lost to Stanford at home by a touchdown in late October. They were averaging almost 36 points a game. The Beavers' Kirk Yliniemi, who had replaced Ryan Cesca as the field goal kicker partway through the Northern Arizona game, kicked 43- and 28-yard field goals to pace the Beavers to a 6–3 halftime lead. The Ducks only had 98 yards total offense in the first half.

The 6–3 lead held up until the fourth quarter. The Ducks defense forced the Beavers to punt nine seconds into the final period. The ensuing play is probably the most controversial "no call" in Civil War history. Keenan Howry picked up the ball at the Duck 24. Kyle Roselle looked like he was in perfect position to make the play but was pushed forward and away from the play by Ty Tomlin. Howry ran 76 yards down the field untouched to give the Ducks their first lead of the ball game. Most Beaver fans who saw the game insist that Tomlin's block was in Roselle's back and thus illegal. Most Duck fans insist that the block was not in Roselle's back and thus clean.  Whether Tomlin's block was legal or not, the touchdown stood. Oregon's Maurice Morris tacked on an eight-yard touchdown with 4:36 left, which appeared to put the game out of reach. However, the Beavers did not fold. They capped off an 11-play drive with a 24-yard Jonathan Smith to Josh Hawkins pass with 2:05 left, Smith's last touchdown pass. Smith hit Shawn Kintner for the two-point conversion to pull Oregon State within three at 17–14. However, the onside kick squirted out-of-bounds at the Beaver 45, which looked as if it would wrap up an Oregon victory. But on third-and-nine with 1:49 left, Joey Harrington rolled out. Kyle Roselle managed to strip the Heisman Trophy hopeful and Jake Cookus pounced on the ball at the Duck 33. However, the Beavers lost seven yards on two plays. On third-and-17, Smith rolled back to pass and threw to James Newson. However, Newson slipped on the Autzen turf and the pass was intercepted by Rashad Bauman with about a minute left, ending the Beavers' last chance.

The Oregon win was something of a Pyrrhic victory for the Ducks. Joey Harrington completed 11 of 22 passes for 104 yards and carried three times for -34 yards, 70 total yards, no touchdowns, and a fumble. It effectively ended Harrington's Heisman chances. In addition, although the Ducks won, the computers punished them for the narrow victory. Oregon dropped as far as three spots in the six computer polls which took margin of victory into account. However, the loss did not prove to be a complete moral victory for the Beavers. Jonathan Smith thoroughly outplayed Harrington, completing 20 of 38 passes for 252 yards, a touchdown, an interception, and rushed once for -4 yards.  The 248 total yards made Smith Oregon State's all-time total yardage leader. However, Ken Simonton finished with 84 yards, bringing his season total to 971 yards, 29 yards short of 1000.

2002 — bounce-back season

2002 began in Corvallis against Eastern Kentucky, a 49–10 Oregon State win. The following Thursday, the Beavers traveled to Philadelphia to play Temple. Behind four Derek Anderson touchdown passes, Oregon State prevailed 35–3. The win remains the easternmost Beaver victory since the 1962 Liberty Bowl. Nine days later, Anderson one-upped himself, throwing for a Beaver record-tying five touchdowns and running for another, in a 47–17 Oregon State victory over UNLV.

The next weekend, Fresno State came to Corvallis. Dennis Erickson said that he had counted all 382 days since the Bulldogs beat the Beavers in 2001 and that the 2001 loss gnawed at him. Oregon State fans sold out Reser Stadium in anticipation. In the first quarter, Aric Williams plowed through Fresno State's punt returner for a personal foul. The Beavers earned another personal foul in the melee that followed. Revenge had been gained, and the hit set the tempo. A minute later, Richard Siegler intercepted a Jeff Grady pass and returned it 65 yards for a 7–0 Oregon State lead.  After Fresno kicked a 25-yard field goal, Derek Anderson found Kenny Farley for a 48-yard touchdown pass. Ryan Cesca tacked on a 51-yard field goal for a 17–3 first-quarter lead. The Bulldogs responded with three field goals to pull within 17–12, but Derek Anderson threw two more touchdown passes to James Newson and Shawn Kintner to put the Beavers up 31–12 at halftime. In the third quarter, Steven Jackson rushed for two touchdowns and Dwight Wright ran for another. Noah Happe capped Oregon State scoring when he returned an interception 52 yards for a touchdown and a 59–12 lead. Fresno's backup quarterback, Paul Pinegar, threw a 3-yard touchdown pass to make the final score a more-respectable 59–19. The loss was the biggest for the Bulldogs since 1996. It also was the most points the Beavers had scored since 1996's 67–22 win over Northern Illinois.

At the end of September, the Trojans shut out the Beavers 22–0 in the Coliseum. The following weekend, UCLA came to Corvallis. On Oregon State's first play from scrimmage, Steven Jackson rumbled 80 yards for a touchdown and a 7–0 lead. On UCLA's ensuing possession, they drove into field goal range, but Nick Barnett blocked UCLA's field goal attempt which was returned for an 83-yard touchdown by Dennis Weathersby, the longest blocked field goal return in Beaver history. Less than six minutes into the game, the Beavers were up 14–0. UCLA then took over, however, scoring the game's next 29 points. In the fourth quarter, the two teams traded touchdowns. Noah Happe returned a fumble 19 yards to pull the Beavers within eight, 43–35, with a little more than two minutes left.  However, UCLA was able to recover the onside kick and run out the clock for the win.

The following weekend, in Tempe, Arizona, Oregon State built a 9–3 third-quarter lead on three Kirk Yliniemi field goals. The Sun Devils took the lead on a 46-yard screen pass from Andrew Walter to Hakim Hill and followed it with a 46-yard field goal to take a 13–9 third-quarter lead. Late in the fourth quarter, facing fourth-and-seven at the Beaver 48, Derek Anderson found Steven Jackson for a 28-yard pass. Oregon State had the ball first-and-goal at the nine-yard line, but Anderson's first pass attempt was deflected.  With less than a minute left, Anderson was sacked for a six-yard loss. On third-and-goal, Anderson was sacked again for a 17-yard loss with 19 seconds left. Inexplicably, the Beavers were unable to get a final play off, and Arizona State left 13–9 winners.

After beating California 24–13, Oregon State beat Arizona 38–3, the identical score as in 2001. It was the first time that the Beavers had defeated a team by an identical score in two consecutive years since Oregon State beat Idaho 34–0 in 1946 and 1947. Oregon State then split with Stanford and Washington. In the Civil War, Derek Anderson broke a 17–17 tie by throwing a 10-yard touchdown pass to Shawn Kintner with 28 seconds left in the first half. The Beavers tacked on two third-quarter touchdowns to pull away from the Ducks, winning 45–24. The win left Oregon State tied for fourth in the Pac-10 and Oregon in eighth place.

Oregon State was invited to play Pittsburgh in the Insight Bowl in Phoenix, Arizona. Pittsburgh got the ball first. Larry Fitzgerald made a spectacular, diving 40-yard touchdown catch. Oregon State answered when James Newson ran into the end zone for a 65-yard touchdown reception. The teams entered the locker room tied 10–10 at halftime. The Beavers started with the ball in the second half.  Oregon State tried a flea flicker, but Derek Anderson's pass was intercepted and returned to the Beaver 23. After the interception, the Panther's Rod Rutherford eventually plowed into the end zone from one-yard out to post a 17–10 lead. Pittsburgh scored another touchdown on a 66-yard punt return for a 24–10 lead.  Kirk Yliniemi kicked a 31-yard field goal to narrow the deficit to 24–13, but Oregon State would get no closer. The Panthers tacked on two touchdowns with less than six minutes left, which made the final score 38–13.

2003—2014 — Mike Riley (2nd tenure)

2003 — Back to the bowl

In February 2003, Dennis Erickson resigned to become the new coach for the San Francisco 49ers. Corvallis native and former OSU coach Mike Riley, who had been fired as coach of the San Diego Chargers at the end of the 2001–2002 season, was hired to replace him.

The 2003 season started strong, with a 40–7 win over I-AA Sacramento State, but was followed by a 16–14 loss at Fresno State. The Beavers bounced back to win back-to-back home games against non-BCS schools, beating New Mexico State 28–16 and Boise State 26–24. The win over BSU would prove to be the Broncos' only loss of the season, which they would finish ranked #16.

The Beavers then upset #24 Arizona State, 45–17, at home, and traveled to Berkeley to defeat California, 35–21, in what would prove to be their only true road win of the year. After a bye week, they found themselves ranked #22 with the anticipation of games against the Washington schools. Alas, the good times would not last, and the Beavers fell 38–17 to the Huskies in Corvallis, followed by a 36–30 defeat in Pullman to the #6 ranked Cougars.

OSU returned home to reach bowl eligibility with a 52–23 win over Arizona, and to improve to 7–3 (4–2 Pac-10) with a 43–3 shellacking of Stanford. However, the Civil War would once again go to the home team, with the Ducks winning 34–20, and the regular season would end with a 52–28 loss at #2 and eventual (AP) national champion USC.

The Beavers would be invited to face the New Mexico Lobos in the 2003 Las Vegas Bowl, which they would win, 55–14.

2004 — Overcoming a slow start

The Beavers' 2004 season opened in Baton Rouge against #3 LSU. OSU were beaten 22–21, in overtime. In his college debut, Alexis Serna missed three extra points; the third miss, in overtime, sealed the loss. It was an inauspicious start to an illustrious career. The following Friday, Boise State would avenge their only loss of the previous season, defeating the Beavers 53–34; OSU was the first team from a BCS conference to ever fall to the Broncos. After a 17–7 win over New Mexico, the Beavers would drop back-to-back games to ranked opponents, dropping a road game 27–14 to Arizona State, and falling at home 49–7 to #10 California. At 1–4, a winning season looked unlikely.

However, a turnaround was in the works. Playing three straight games against mediocre teams helped; OSU defeated Washington, Washington State, and Arizona, who combined for a total of 9 wins in 2004 (including the three games against each other; Washington would finish 1–10). A visit from #1 USC was expected to result in a blowout loss. In a thick fog, the Beavers jumped out to a 13–0 lead. However, the Trojans, led by future Heisman winner (and loser) Reggie Bush, would score the next 28 points and hold on to win, 28–20.

After defeating Stanford, the Beavers entered the Civil War with a bowl berth on the line; both teams entered the game at 5–5. The outcome was never in doubt, as the Beavers won in Corvallis, 50–21. Alexis Serna redeemed himself by kicking five field goals, Derek Anderson passed for 351 yards in his final home game, and Mike Hass caught nine passes for 154 yards and two touchdowns. OSU's 50 points were a team Civil War record.

For the second time in five years, the Beavers' bowl game was against Notre Dame in the state of Arizona, this time at the Insight Bowl in downtown Phoenix. Oregon State jumped to a 21–0 lead and never trailed, cruising to a 38–21 victory.

References

Oregon State Beavers